= Wellington station (MBTA) =

Rapid transit station in Medford, Massachusetts, US

Wellington
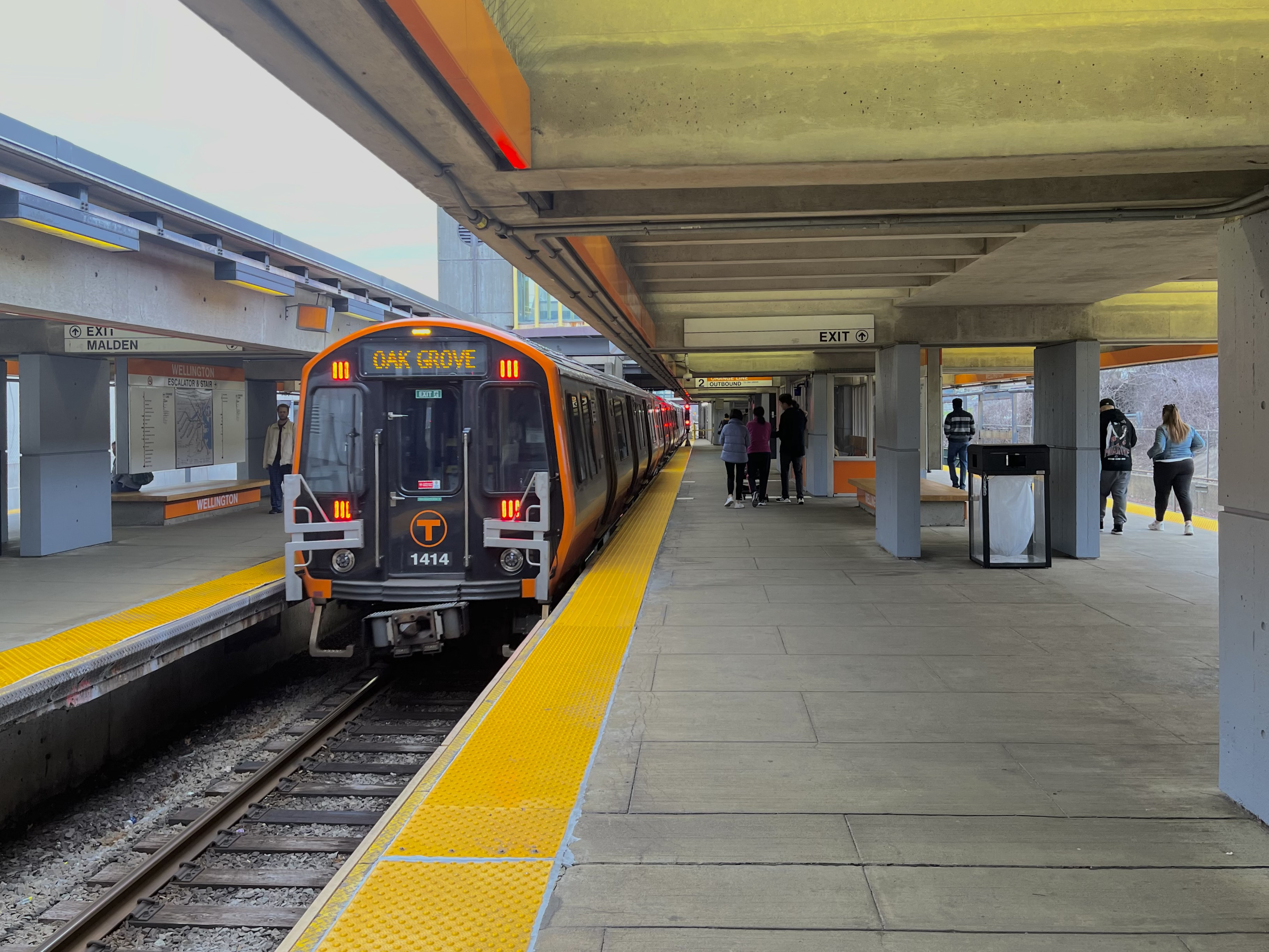
- A northbound train departing Wellington station in April 2024

General information
- Location: Revere Beach Parkway and Rivers Edge Drive; Medford, Massachusetts
- Coordinates: 42.401907°N 71.077096°W
- Line: Haymarket North Extension
- Platforms: 2 island platforms
- Tracks: 3 (2 in regular service)
- Connections: MBTA bus: 97, 99, 100, 106, 108, 110, 112, 134

Construction
- Parking: 1,316 spaces ($9.00 daily)
- Cycle facilities: 16 spaces
- Accessible: Yes

History
- Opened: September 6, 1975

Passengers
- FY2019: 7,174 (weekday average boardings)

Services
Preceding station	MBTA	Following station
Assembly toward Forest Hills	Orange Line	Malden Center toward Oak Grove
Former services at B&M station
Preceding station	Boston and Maine Railroad	Following station
East Somerville toward Boston	Medford Branch	Glenwood toward Medford
Location

Wellington station is a Massachusetts Bay Transportation Authority (MBTA) Orange Line rapid transit station in Medford, Massachusetts, near the border of Everett. It is located on the Revere Beach Parkway (Route 16), slightly east of its intersection with Route 28. Wellington functions as a park and ride with more than 1,300 spaces, and a bus hub with eight routes terminating at the station. The Station Landing development, connected to the station by an overhead walkway, includes residential and retail buildings and additional parking. Wellington Carhouse, the primary repair and maintenance facility for the Orange Line, is located adjacent to the station.

The Boston and Maine Railroad opened through the east part of what is now Medford in 1845, followed by the Medford Branch in 1847. Wellington station was soon opened near the junction; it closed with the end of passenger service on the branch in 1957. The modern station opened in September 1975 as part of the Haymarket North Extension. It was made accessible in the 1990s. An automated people mover to the adjacent development opened in 1997 and closed in 2006; it has since been replaced by a footbridge.

== Station layout ==
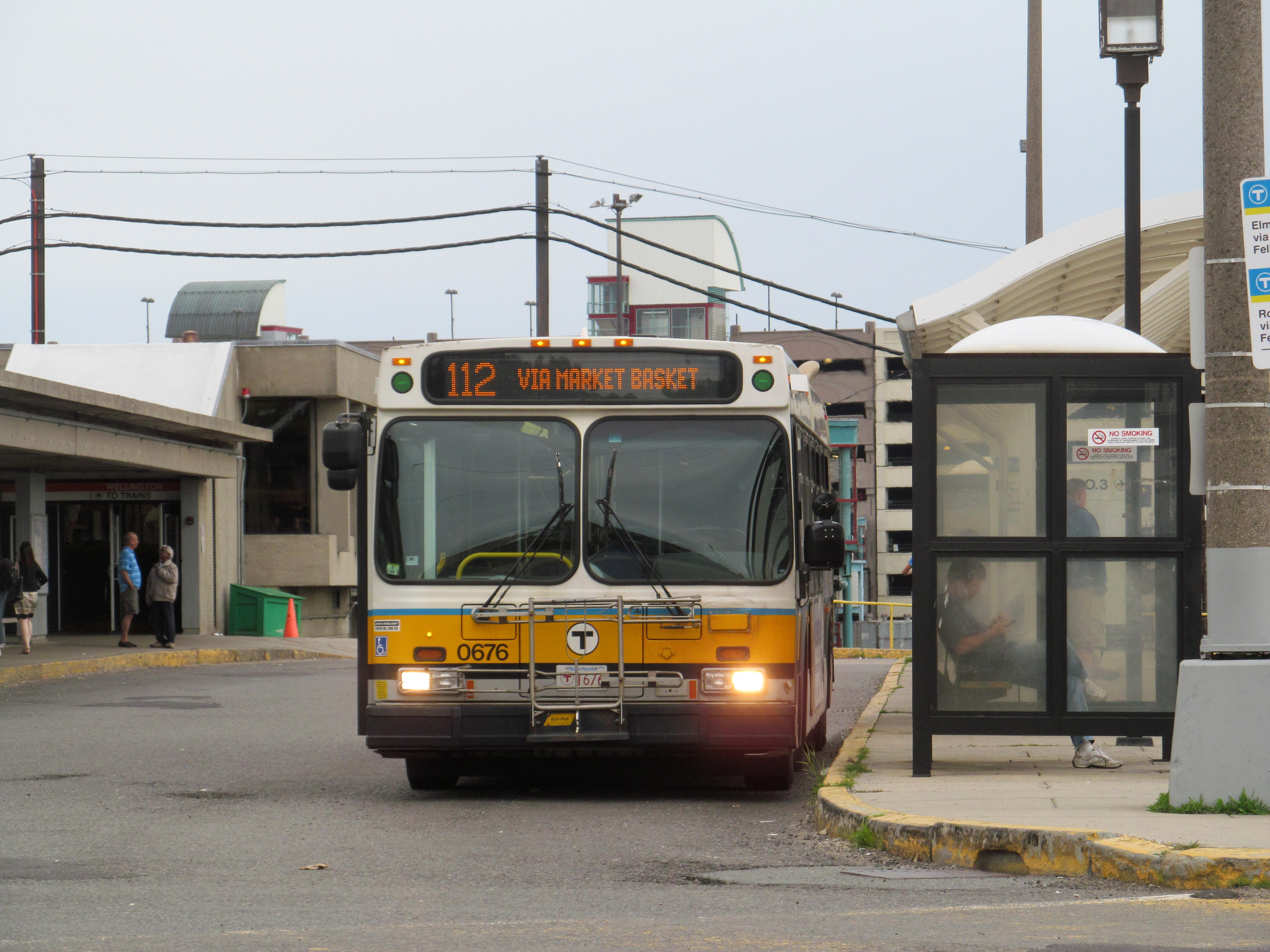
A route 112 bus at the Wellington busway

Three Orange Line tracks run north–south through Wellington station. Only the west (southbound) and center (northbound) Orange Line tracks are used for revenue service; the unused east track, originally intended for express service, is only used for maintenance and testing. A pair of island platforms are located between the Orange Line tracks; the west platform serves trains in both directions, while the east platform serves only northbound trains. The single Haverhill Line track is located east of the Orange Line tracks. The fare mezzanine is located over the north end of the station.

Wellington Yard, the primary maintenance and storage facility for the Orange Line fleet, is located west of the station. A parking garage shared by the station and the Station Landing development is west of the yard. It is connected to the fare mezzanine with an 800-foot (240 m)-long enclosed walkway. Wellington station is fully accessible from both entrances, with elevators connecting the mezzanine to the platforms. A footbridge at the south end of the station connects only to the maintenance facility and is not in public use.

Wellington is a major MBTA bus transfer station, with service to Medford, Everett, Malden and other surrounding cities. Buses serve the station via a dedicated three-lane busway inside the parking lot on the eastern side of the station. Wellington is served by MBTA bus routes 97, 99, 100, 106, 108, 110, 112, and 134.

== History ==
=== Boston and Maine station ===
The Boston and Maine Railroad's Western Route main line was built through the east side of what is now Medford in 1845, and the Medford branch from Medford Junction to Medford Square opened in 1847. Wellington station, also called Medford Junction, was in use by 1852. Located between 5th Street and 6th Street about 0.2 miles (0.32 km) to the south of the junction, it served as the connection between the mainline and the Medford branch. The station was originally located in Everett; the east tract of Wellington Farm, including the station area, was annexed to Medford in 1875. By the 1920s, Wellington station was a two-story wooden building located on the west side of the tracks. The station building was abandoned around 1943, along with Glenwood and Park Street on the branch, to reduce the B&M tax bill. The station served only Medford Branch local service by the 1940s; it closed with the end of passenger service on the branch on October 1, 1957.

=== Modern station ===
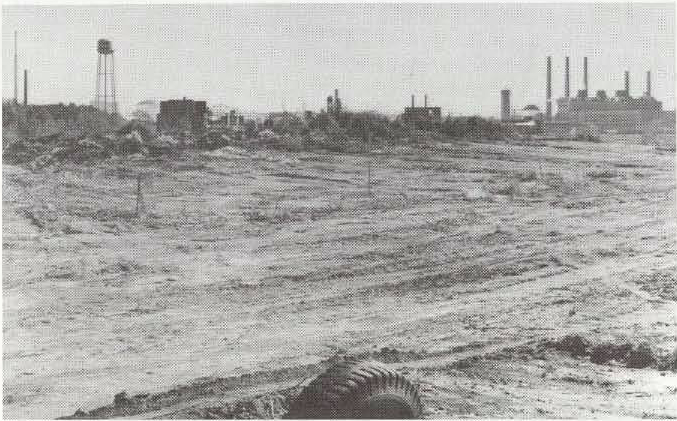
Wellington Dump in 1972, shortly before construction of the station

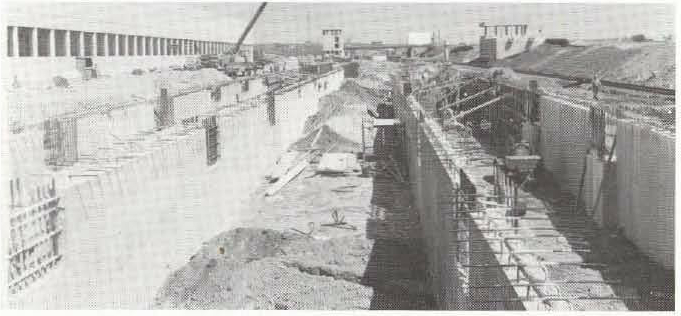
Construction of foundations for the platforms around 1973

Unlike the Washington Street Elevated which was built at the same time with a similar design, the Charlestown El was located very near Boston Harbor and the Mystic River tidal estuary, and was thus continually exposed to accelerated corrosion caused by salt air. The elevated was also unpopular with many local residents, as it was noisy and blocked out sunlight to Main Street. In the 1960s, it was determined that a replacement elevated would not be wise to build, and that a full-length replacement tunnel would be too expensive.

Instead, the Haymarket North Extension project consisted of a tunnel segment from Haymarket near Boston's downtown through a new underground stop at North Station, then under the Charles River to a portal near Community College. From there the extension was built along the Haverhill Line commuter rail right of way, lowering land acquisition difficulties.

When planning the line in the mid-1960s, the MBTA decided that the 40-acre Wellington Dump site, located south of the previous station sites, was the best location for a rapid transit stop to serve the east part of Medford. The new site provided ample room for parking and bus transfer areas, as well as a maintenance depot to replace the Sullivan Square shops (which were being torn down with the Elevated), plus easy access to Route 16 and Route 28.

Wellington Yard opened on July 15, 1975, followed by the station on September 6, as part of the second phase of the Haymarket North Extension. The 125,000 square feet (11,600 m^{2}) building could hold three-and-a-half six-car trains. Wellington was the first station on the line to serve an area that had not previously had rapid transit, unlike Sullivan Square and Community College which approximately replaced former elevated stations. Wellington was the northern terminus of the Orange Line until Malden Center opened on December 27, 1975, and some trains terminated at Wellington until Oak Grove opened on March 19, 1977. From February 1 to December 16, 1981, Malden Center and Oak Grove stations were closed on Sundays as part of systemwide austerity program. Wellington was the northern terminus of the line on these days, with a bus shuttle run to the closed stations.

Wellington station was not originally accessible. Addition of elevators at Wellington and Sullivan Square began in 1991. The entire Orange Line, including Wellington station, was closed from August 19 to September 18, 2022, during maintenance work. The Encore Boston Harbor casino ran shuttles to Wellington from its June 2019 opening until July 2024.

=== Development ===
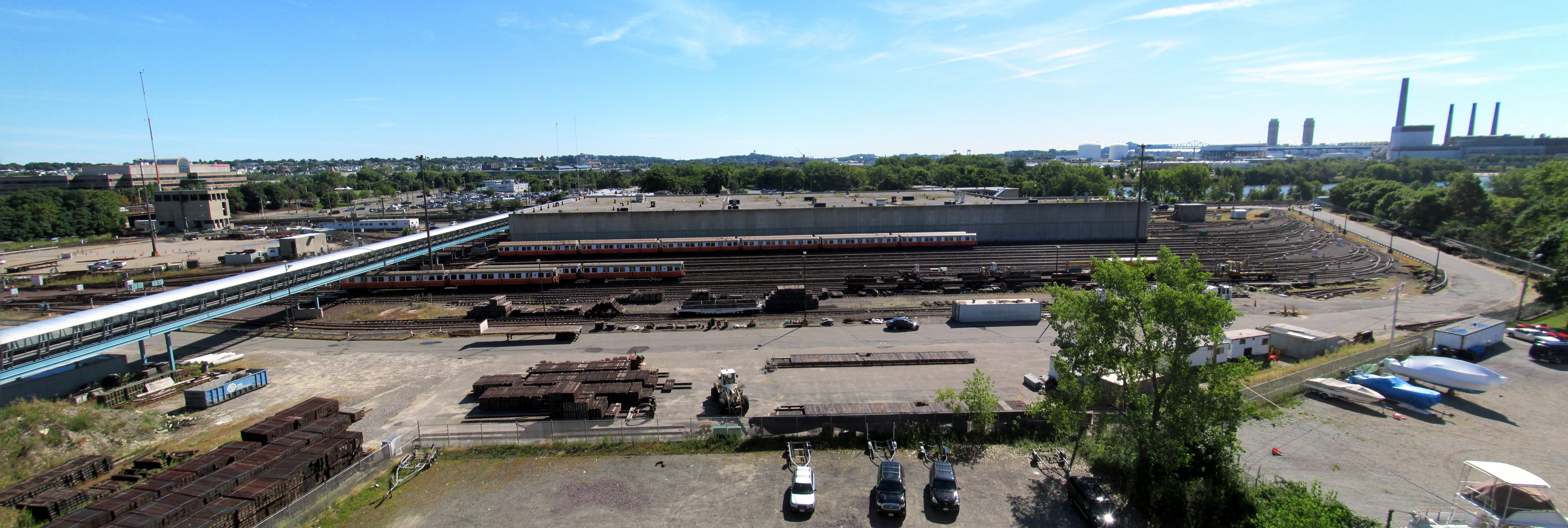
Wellington Carhouse and Yard were designed for construction of an air rights development over them

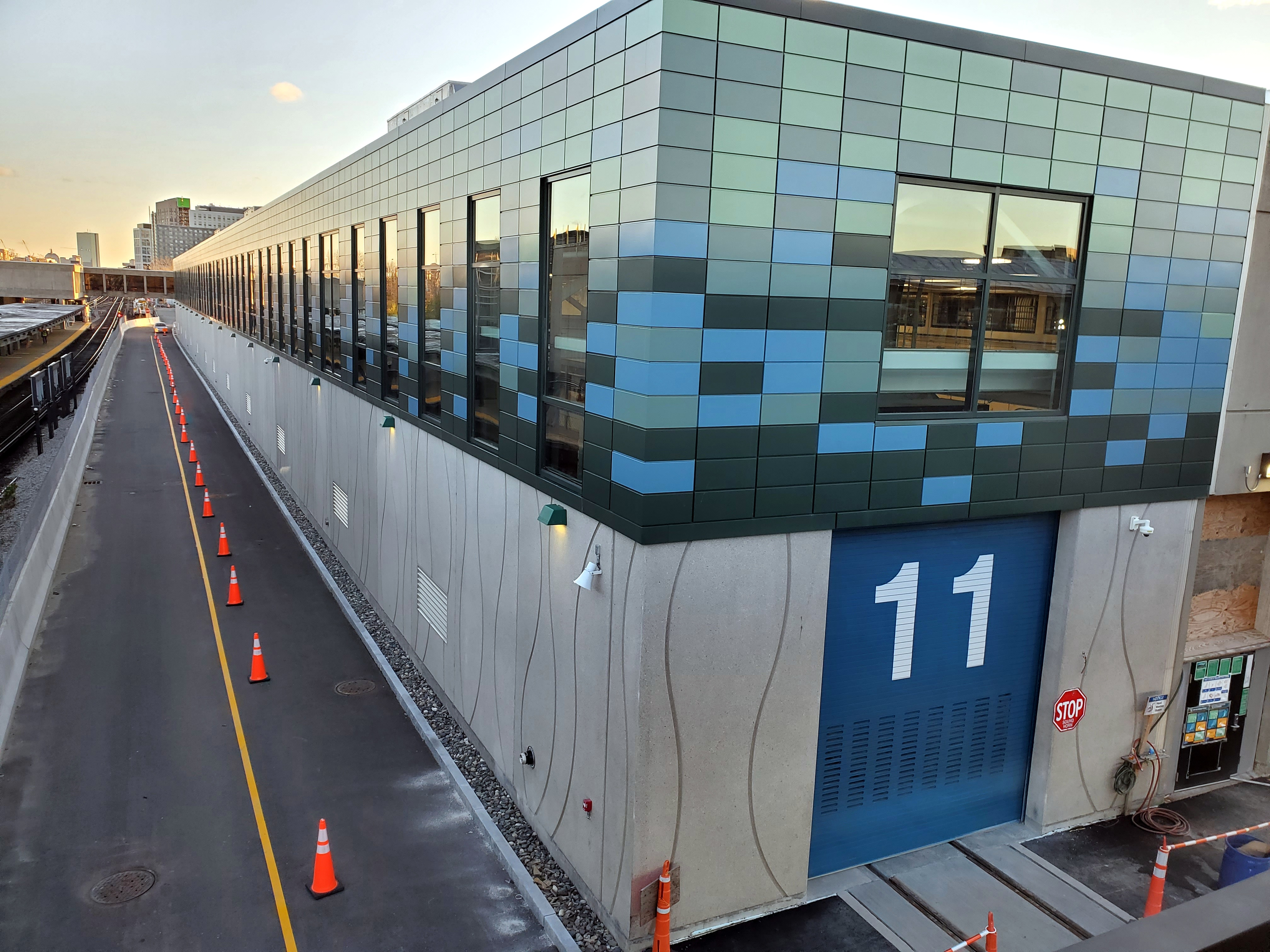
Wellington Carhouse, opened as the primary Orange Line repair facility in 1975

In 1969, Mayor and State Representative John McGlynn sponsored the first of two bills to permit air rights development over the station and Route 16. The same year, Medford received a letter of agreement from the MBTA to build a parking garage over the tracks and the planned maintenance facility to free up development space. Unlike most MBTA stations, air rights over the station are owned by the city of Medford rather than by the MBTA.

After city-done studies of population and land use, the Massachusetts Department of Public Works and the Federal Highway Administration held a study of several development options for Wellington, which would have involved air rights construction directly over the station. Options considered in this 1976 report included a minimum residential/transit deck, a moderate residential/transit garage, or a full-build shopping center, office, residential, nursing home, and transit garage. These plans also called for the 16/28 intersection to be partially grade separated, and a traffic circle to replace the blind underpass used for automobile and bus access to the station.

Based on this study, the city of Medford continued to pursue development at Wellington. The preferred alternative in the 1981 Final Environmental Impact Statement included a parking garage built above the carhouse and rail yard, additional parking and a retail mall between the yard and Route 28, hotel and office space over the original parking lots, and condominiums and elderly housing northeast of the 16/28 intersection. Route 16 would have been placed in an underpass at the intersection, the ramps from 16 to the station parking improved, and a full park built along the riverfront.

However, the planned developments were only partially built, and none of the planned interchange improvements came to fruition. The first new construction was several office buildings in the northeast parcel in the early 1990s, followed by the Wellington Garage west of the rail yard in 1997. The MBTA agreed to lease 950 spaces of the 1350-space, 9-level garage for 15 years, after which the MBTA took ownership of 600 of the spaces and the remainder reverted to the developer. The Station Landing complex, envisioned as new urbanist transit-oriented development, was constructed over much of that time period, finishing around 2012. The project included 600 condominiums in a 12-story complex, 125,000 square feet (11,600 m^{2}) of retail space (with the possibility of over 1 million square feet at full build), and an expansion of the garage to 1900 spaces.

Some of the property fronting the Mystic River has been turned into parkland; the first three of four stages of the 1.3 miles (2.1 km) Wellington Greenway opened in November 2012. The trail, funded by the Massachusetts Environmental Trust and developers Preotle, Lane & Associates, runs partially along the embankment of the Haverhill Line's former Mystic River drawbridge.

In September 2022, the city requested proposals for development on two sites at the station: a 17.3-acre (7.0 ha) parcel over the yard, station, and Orange Line tracks; and a 10.75-acre (4.35 ha) parcel over the station parking lots. The development would have to accommodate an MBTA electric bus garage, which is expected to replace the existing Fellsway Garage by 2029. Eight developers submitted proposals. In August 2025, the MBTA purchased a different site in Medford for the garage, citing difficulties with integrating the garage into the development.

=== People mover ===
In May 1996, construction began on an automated people mover to connect the station with the Mystic Center (later "Station Landing") office complex and park and ride. Completed in October 1997 at a cost of $2.9 million, the 760-foot-long (230 m) "horizontal elevator" was designed to carry 1,000 commuters a day at speeds up to 25 mph (40 km/h) taking about 55 seconds to travel end to end.

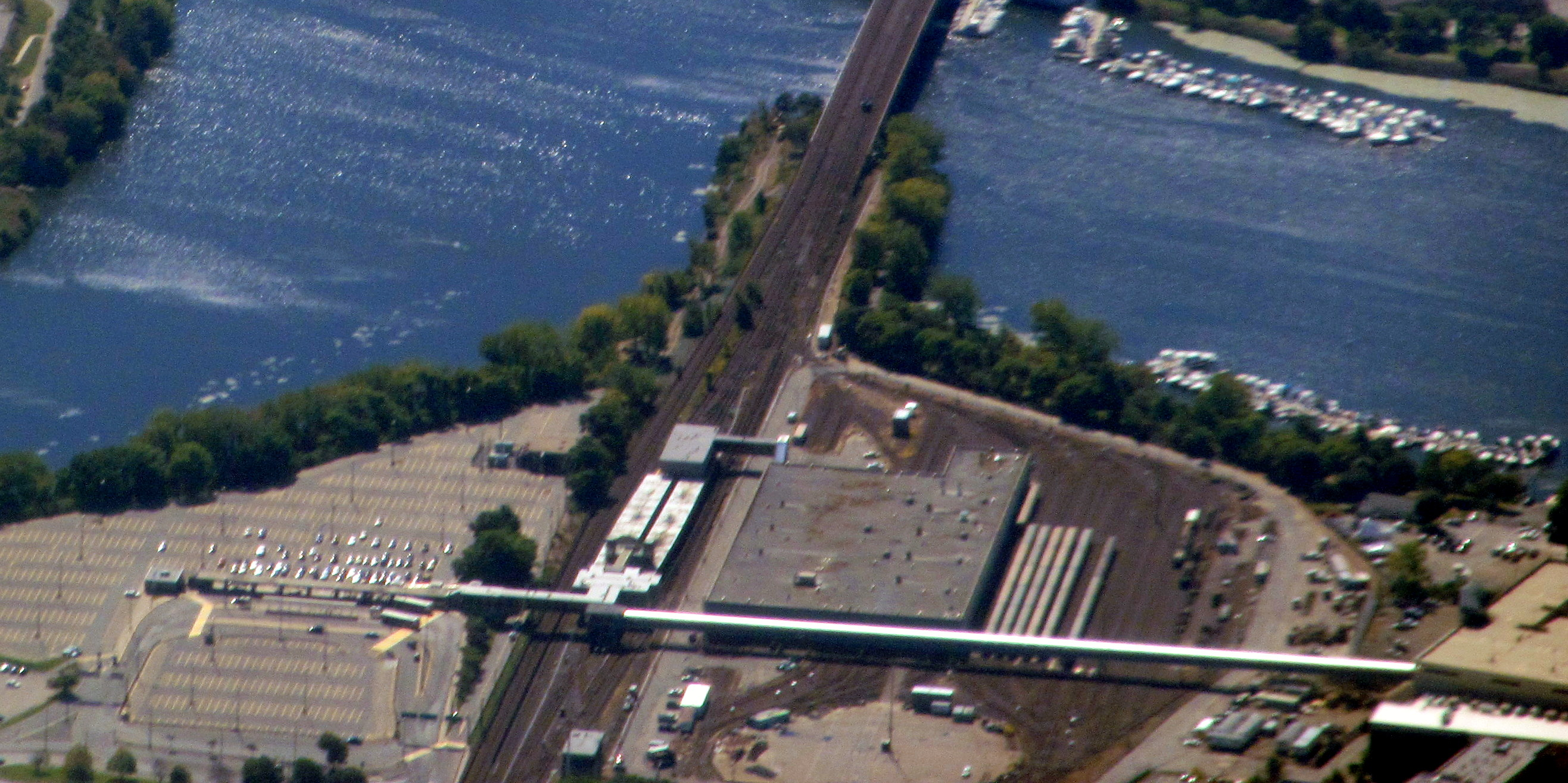
Aerial view of Wellington in 2012 showing the 2006-built pedestrian bridge

Constructed by Poma-Otis Transportation Systems, a joint venture of Poma and the Otis Elevator Company, the people mover consisted of a pair of independent cable-hauled cars on two parallel tracks. Unlike other Otis-built people movers, which float on a cushion of air, the Wellington people mover was the first by Otis to run on steel rails. Each eight-seat glass sided car could carry up to 45 passengers or 7,200 pounds (3,300 kg) resulting in a maximum capacity of 1,600 people per hour per direction. Riders entered and exited from pairs of sliding doors on the ends of the carriages, with a third door providing access to the emergency walkway between the two tracks.

The people mover was plagued by mechanical problems, which resulted in both high maintenance costs and low reliability. The frequent breakdowns and service outages frustrated riders to such an extent that 91% of users preferred replacing the people mover with a walkway, according to a 2004 survey of 240 Wellington commuters conducted by National Development, owners of the Station Landing property.

In August 2006, less than ten years after it first opened, the people mover was demolished, and an above-ground covered walkway was constructed on top of the existing viaduct structure. Off-site fabrication of parts was used to speed construction of the enclosed walkway, while a temporary shuttle-bus connected commuters to the parking structure during the construction. The replacement walkway, named SkyWalk, cost $3 million to construct, and opened in March 2007.

=== Future ===
Wellington was a proposed stop on the Urban Ring Project. The Urban Ring was to be a circumferential bus rapid transit (BRT) Line designed to connect the current radial MBTA rail lines to reduce overcrowding in the downtown stations; it was canceled in 2010. Under draft plans released in 2008, Urban Ring buses would have used dedicated bus lanes paralleling Route 16, with a BRT platform in the existing station busway.

The MBTA plans to extend the south footbridge to the east parking lot and open it as a public entrance. Three elevators will be added to the footbridge, with the two existing station elevators replaced. A design contract was awarded in April 2020. Design work reached 30% completion in 2021 and did not progress further by December 2022.
