= Assembly station =

Rapid transit station in Somerville, Massachusetts, US

Assembly
- A southbound train arriving at Assembly station in July 2026

General information
- Location: 499 Foley Street; Somerville, Massachusetts
- Coordinates: 42.39266°N 71.07727°W
- Line: Haymarket North Extension
- Platforms: 1 island platform
- Tracks: 3 (two station tracks and one unused express track)

Construction
- Parking: No MBTA parking; Assembly Square parking is adjacent
- Cycle facilities: Racks provided
- Accessible: Yes

History
- Opened: September 2, 2014

Passengers
- FY2019: 3,977 daily boardings

Services
Preceding station	MBTA	Following station
Sullivan Square toward Forest Hills	Orange Line	Wellington toward Oak Grove
Location

Assembly station (originally Assembly Square in some planning documents) is a rapid transit station in Somerville, Massachusetts. It serves the MBTA's Orange Line. It is an infill station, located on a section of the Orange Line that has been active since 1975. The station, which opened on September 2, 2014, was the first new rail station on the MBTA subway system since 1987. Assembly station is meant to provide convenient access to Assembly Square - a major retail and residential development located on the site of a former Ford assembly plant - and the adjacent Assembly Square Marketplace.

== Station layout ==
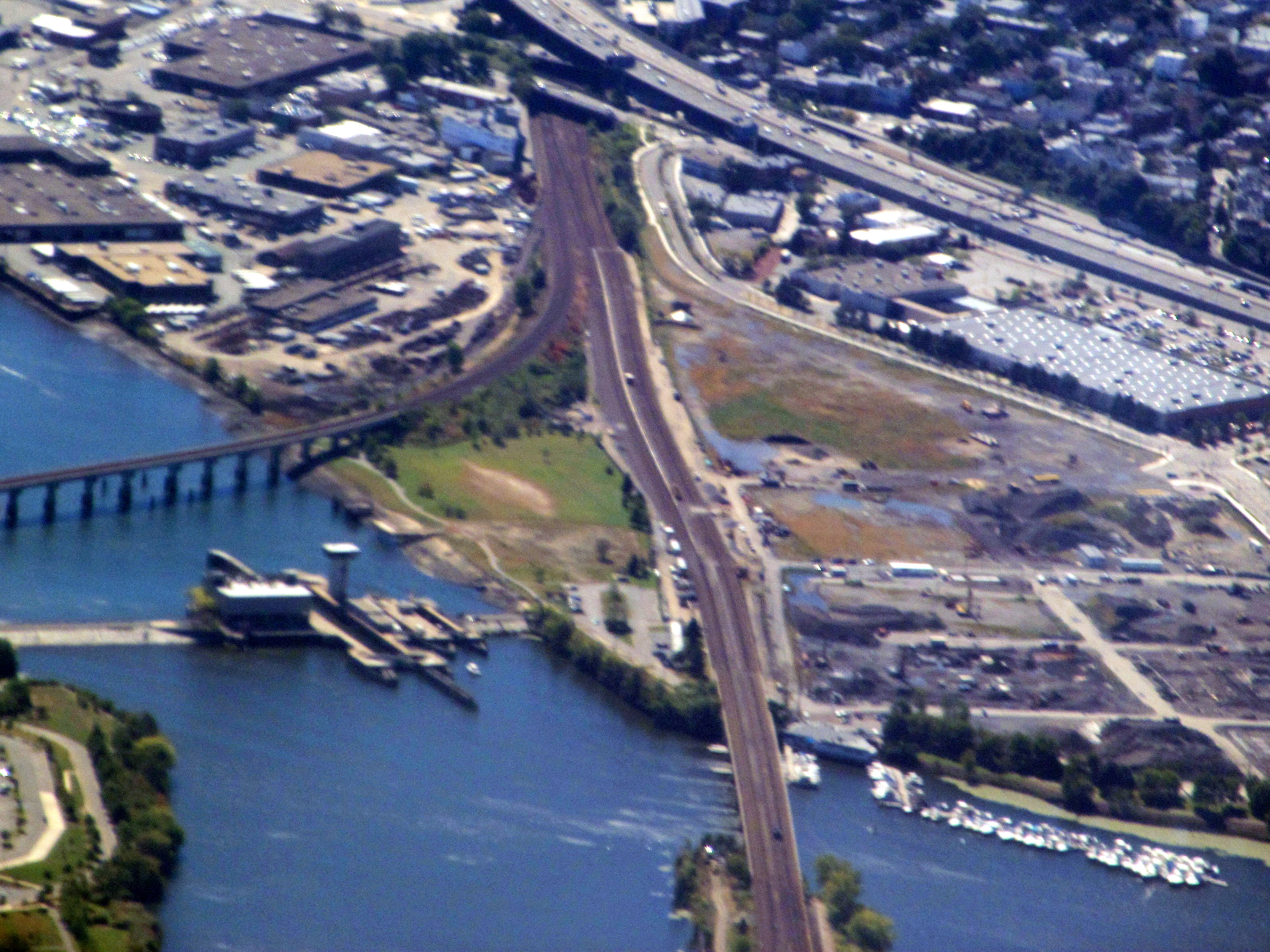
Aerial view of station site in September 2012

Assembly station is on the east side of the Assembly Square development, on the existing Orange Line tracks near the Mystic River. The station consists of a single island platform 410 feet (120 m) long, to handle up to 6 railcars on each side. Unlike Community College, Sullivan, and Wellington, Assembly does not have a second island platform to serve the (currently unused) third track, which was intended to be an express track. The station has two headhouses, one on each end of the platform. Two footbridges, one from each headhouse, cross over the inbound track and connect to parking on G Street. The station is fully accessible and includes bicycle storage facilities. Sullivan Square to the south and Wellington to the north are both major MBTA bus terminals, so Assembly was not designed as a bus transfer station.

Several public art elements are incorporated into the station. These include artistic benches and a metal panel mosaic on the station façade (both designed by Artists for Humanity) and MBTA-designed panels about the site's history.

Adding a commuter rail station at Assembly Square was listed as a possibility in 2012 as an interim air quality mitigation measure in response to delays building the Green Line Extension However, such a station could not be completed by 2015, and the project was not supported by MassDOT. The station would have required building separate platforms for the Haverhill Line and the Newburyport/Rockport Line, which split near the station site.

== History ==
=== Planning ===
Construction was estimated to cost up to $57 million, of which $22 million (plus an optional $3.5 million extra) was from the state's Executive Office of Housing and Economic Development. The remaining cost was divided between federal funding including the FTA Section 5309 New Starts program ($16 million) and the developer of Assembly Square ($15 million), Federal Realty Investment Trust (FRIT). The area around the station formerly hosted a Ford automobile assembly plant, which used the adjacent Western Route for rail access.

Assembly Square was a proposed stop on the Urban Ring Project. The Urban Ring was to be a circumferential bus rapid transit (BRT) Line designed to connect the current radial MBTA rail lines to reduce overcrowding in the downtown stations; it was canceled in 2010. Under draft plans released in 2008, the Urban Ring would have run on Grand Union Boulevard, with a stop at Foley Street about 800 feet (240 m) west of the Orange Line.

On February 8, 2011, the MBTA board unanimously approved a memorandum of understanding between the MBTA and FRIT, which defined the funding sources for the project. The memorandum was a "critical milestone," according to a FRIT executive. Somerville approved the project on May 2, 2011, and two days later the MBTA opened bidding for construction, which was planned to start at the end of 2011.

=== Construction ===
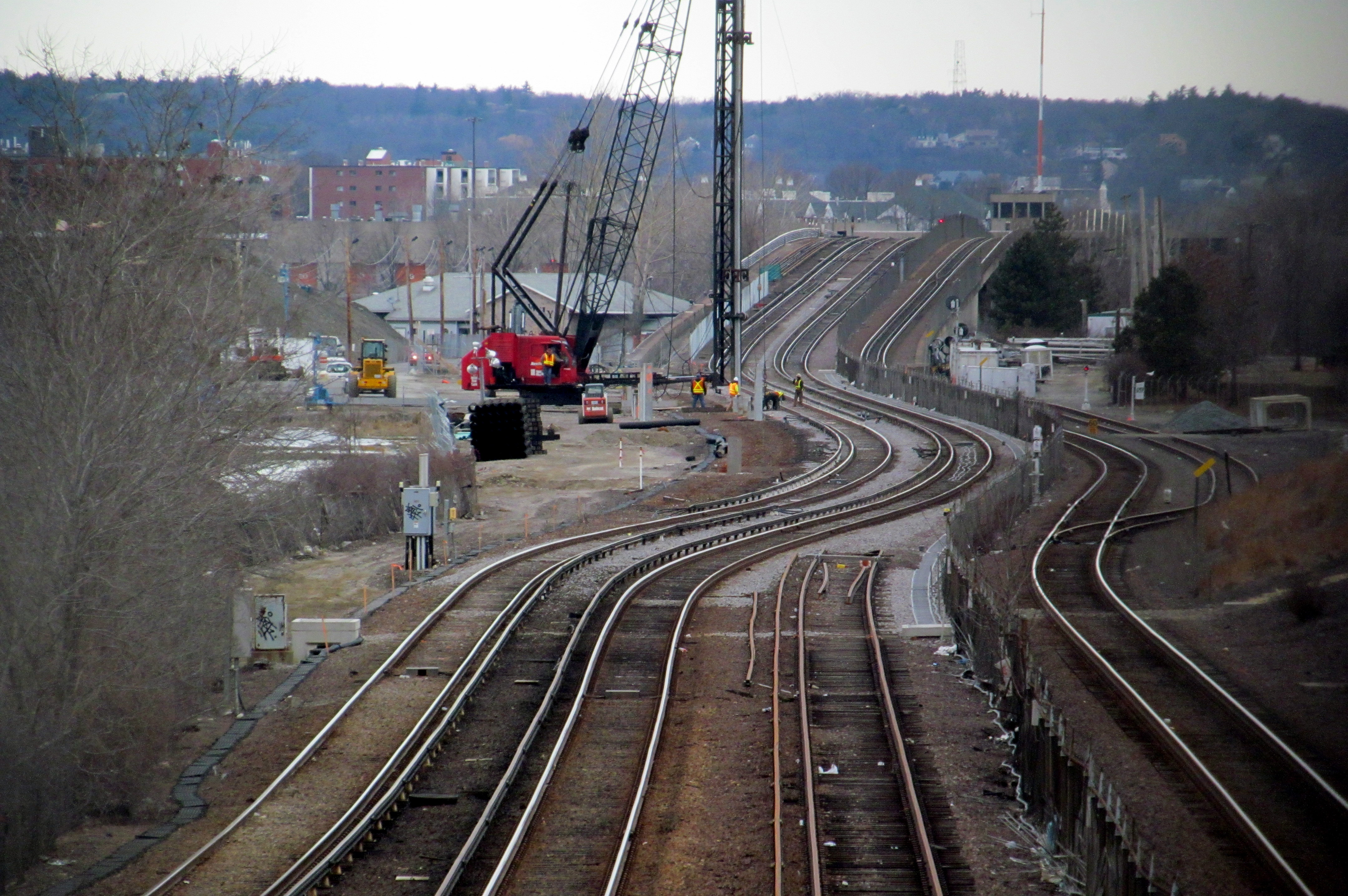
Construction work in January 2013

On October 5, 2011, the MBTA announced the award of a $29,229,184 construction contract to S&R Construction Co., Inc., with construction beginning later that fall. The work required 18 weekend closures of the Orange Line from Sullivan to Oak Grove. The first weekend closures began in June 2012 and continued past the station opening into late 2014. The closures were extended to five nights per week for the second half of 2012, and continued sporadically into 2013 and 2014.

For construction, the MBTA shifted outbound trains to the normally unused express track and inbound trains to the outbound track, to give construction crews full access to the site. In January 2013, the MBTA began constructing concrete pillars to support the platform and headhouses; elevator shaft construction began in the spring. Construction of the headhouse frames began in June 2013, and the platform segments were laid in July. The headhouses were completed in June 2014, with work remaining on other parts of the station.

Inbound trains switched back to the normal inbound track on July 1, 2014; outbound trains began using the normal outbound track on July 21. The station opened to passengers on September 2, 2014, although some final construction work lasted until November. On the first day of operations, the station platform flooded from a rainstorm. Partners Healthcare, which built its headquarters next to the south end of the station, funded the 2016 completion of the south headhouse as a full-time entrance and exit.

=== Service ===
The Assembly Square project was estimated to generate 45,000 new vehicle trips each day, and the station was intended to reduce the number that use private automobiles by diverting travelers to mass transit. In 2011, daily ridership was projected to reach 5,000 riders per day in 2030. Actual daily ridership was 1,864 within the first year, and 3,997 in FY 2019. The entire Orange Line, including Assembly station, was closed from August 19 to September 18, 2022, during maintenance work.

A $49 million footbridge across the Mystic River between Assembly and the Encore Boston Harbor casino in Everett is planned. By 2021, the project was to include an extension of the station's north headhouse to the east, with direct access from Draw 7 Park. By April 2024, design of the bridge was not finished, and the MBTA had not committed to the headhouse extension. In December 2025, The Kraft Group (owner of Major League Soccer's New England Revolution) reached an agreement with the city of Everett for a new soccer stadium in Everett. The deal included $17.5 million for the headhouse expansion, subject to the bridge and headhouse both entering construction within three years of the stadium opening. MassDOT awarded a $9 million contract in September for construction of the bridge. Work was expected begin in October 2026 and last 2.8 years.
