= Malden Center station =

Transit station in Malden, Massachusetts, US

Malden Center
- A northbound Orange Line train at the station in 2026

General information
- Location: Commercial Street at Pleasant Street; Malden, Massachusetts
- Coordinates: 42.426715°N 71.074349°W
- Lines: Haymarket North Extension (Orange Line); Western Route (Haverhill Line)
- Platforms: 1 side platform (Haverhill Line); 1 island platform (Orange Line)
- Tracks: 1 (Haverhill Line); 2 (Orange Line)
- Connections: MBTA bus: 97, 99, 101, 104, 105, 106, 108, 131, 132, 137, 411, 430

Construction
- Structure type: Elevated
- Parking: 195 spaces ($7.50 fee)
- Cycle facilities: 104 spaces in "Pedal and Park" bicycle cage
- Accessible: Yes

Other information
- Fare zone: 1A (Commuter Rail)

History
- Opened: December 27, 1975 (Orange Line)
- Rebuilt: May 1, 1977 (Haverhill Line)

Passengers
- 2024: 101 daily boardings (Haverhill Line)
- FY2019: 11,623 daily boardings (Orange Line)

Services
Preceding station	MBTA	Following station
North Station Terminus	Haverhill Line	Oak Grove toward Haverhill
Wellington toward Forest Hills	Orange Line	Oak Grove Terminus
Former services
Preceding station	Boston and Maine Railroad	Following station
Edgeworth toward Boston	Western Route	Oak Grove toward Portland
Edgeworth toward Boston	Boston – Dover until 1967	Oak Grove toward Dover
Boston Terminus	Boston – Haverhill	Oak Grove toward Haverhill
Location

Malden Center station is a Massachusetts Bay Transportation Authority (MBTA) intermodal transit station in Malden, Massachusetts. Located on an elevated grade above Pleasant Street in downtown Malden, it serves the rapid transit Orange Line and the MBTA Commuter Rail Haverhill Line. The station has one island platform for the two Orange Line tracks and a single side platform for the single commuter rail track. Two busways are used by 12 MBTA bus routes.

The Boston and Maine Railroad opened through Malden in 1845. The original station was replaced in 1871, then again by a brick structure in 1892. The station building was sold for private use in 1958, but commuter trains continued to stop until the modern station opened in December 1975. Commuter trains stopped at the modern station from 1977 to 1979, and have stopped since 1985. A renovation in 2003–2005 added two elevators, making the station accessible.

== Station layout ==
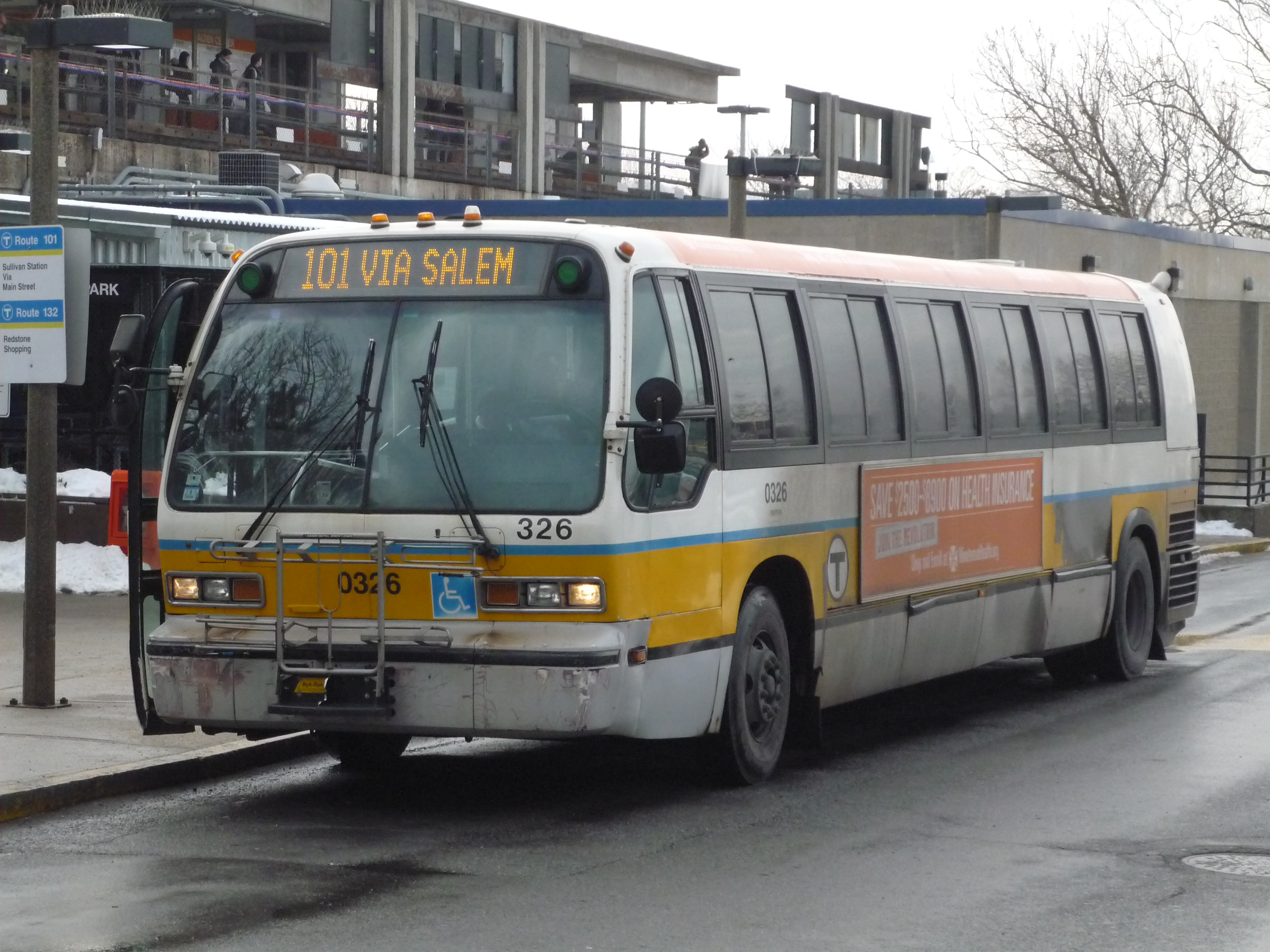
A route 101 bus at the station in 2016

Malden Center station is located on an embankment on the west side of downtown Malden. The Orange Line is on the west side of the station, with two tracks and an island platform. The Western Route, used by the Haverhill Line, has one track and a single side platform on the east side. The fare lobby is under the center of the platforms, with entrances from both sides of the tracks. Malden Center is a major MBTA bus terminal serving routes 97, 99, 101, 104, 105, 106, 108, 131, 132, 137, 411, and 430. A two-lane busway used by most routes is located on the east side of the station, with a one-lane busway on the west side.

== History ==
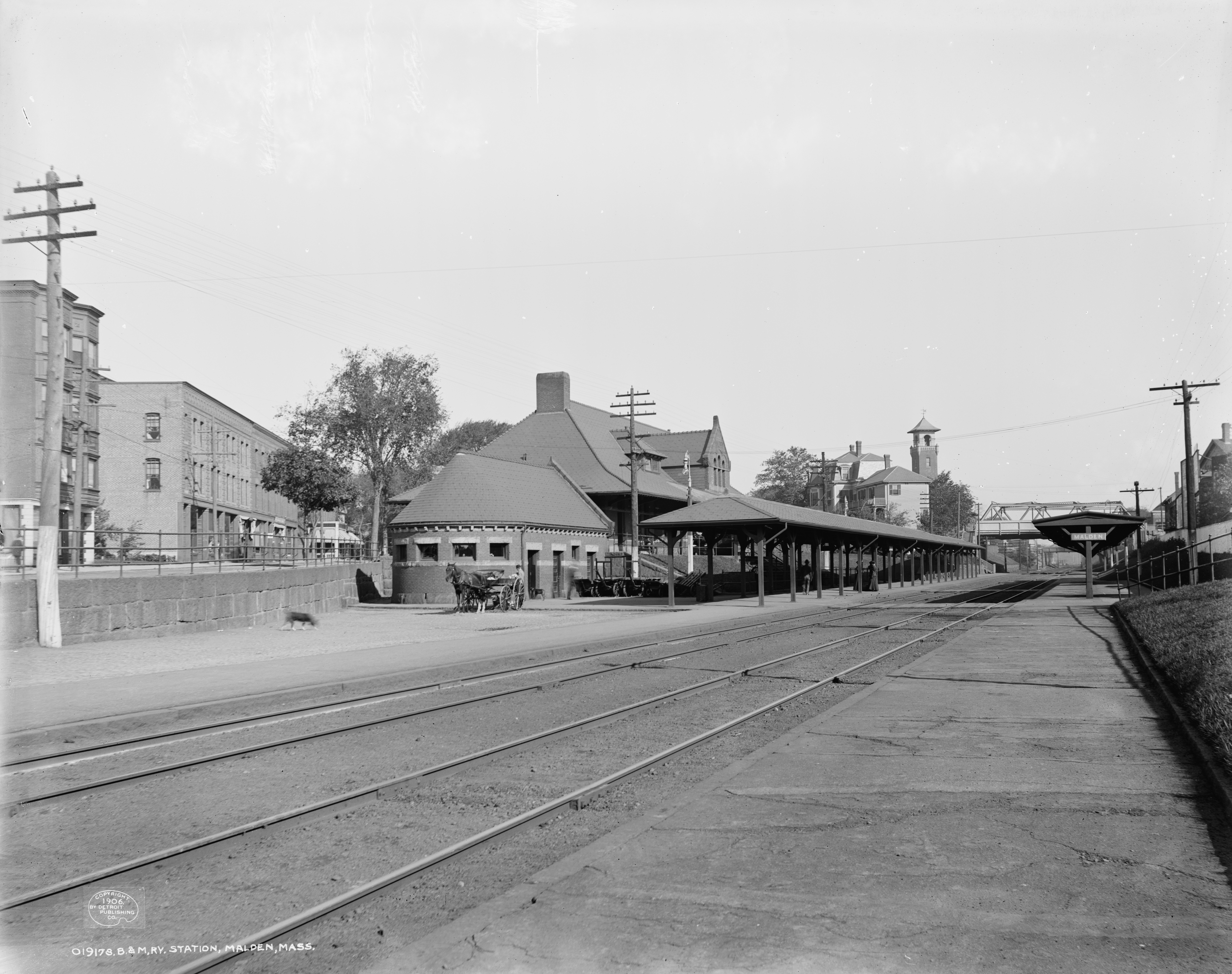
Malden station in 1906

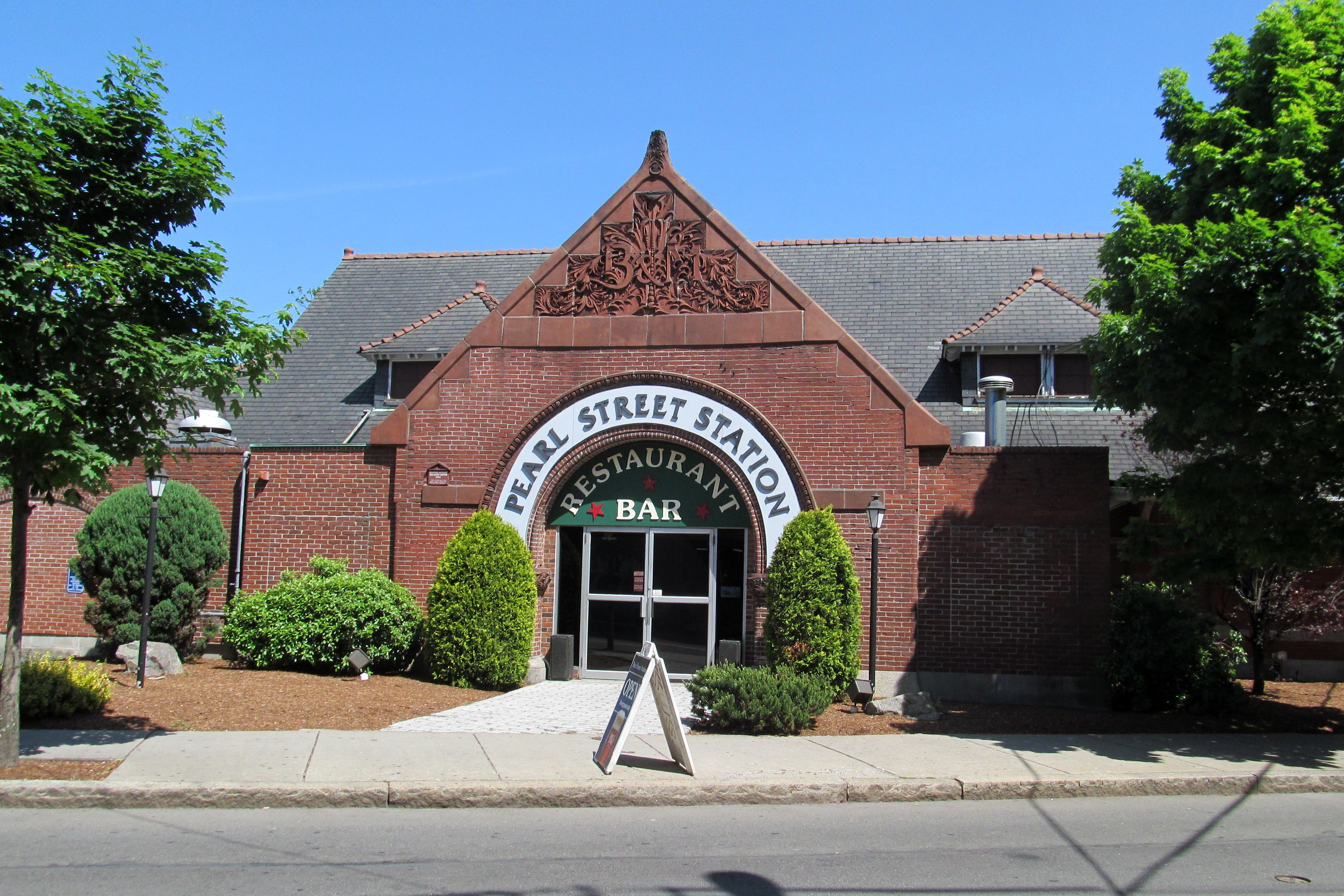
The former station repurposed as a restaurant

The Boston and Maine Railroad (B&M) opened through Malden in July 1845. The first station was a two-story wooden depot on the east side of the tracks at Pleasant Street; it was replaced by a smaller station on the west side in 1871. In May 1891, the B&M began construction of a new station as part of a grade crossing elimination project. The new station opened in 1892. In 1958, the station building was purchased from the B&M for just $1,000 (equivalent to $11,200 in 2025). It was renovated for use as a restaurant and banquet hall, which opened by 1962.

Malden Center station opened on December 27, 1975, as part of the MBTA's Haymarket North Extension of the Orange Line. Expansion to Malden had been a long-time goal of the Boston Elevated Railway, and the Everett extension of the Charlestown Elevated was originally planned to go past Everett and into Malden and Reading via Main Street. However, residents of Malden were opposed to the elevated railroad structure that was planned, and prevented the extension. The 1975 extension was built along the existing Western Route embankment rather than Main Street.

The former station platform closed simultaneously with the opening of the Orange Line station. A high-level platform - the first on the MBTA system - was installed along the Reading Line track, but Reading Line trains did not stop. The platform opened for regular service on May 1, 1977, but closed again on September 1, 1979. After the approach trestles to the North Station drawbridges burned on January 20, 1984, Malden Center became the temporary inbound terminus for the Haverhill Line. The terminal was changed to Oak Grove on February 15, 1984. North Station reopened on April 20, 1985; the commuter platform at Oak Grove closed but the platform at Malden was reopened. The switch may have been made due to a request by John A. Brennan Jr., who was then constructing a large development near Malden Center station.

Because of its Orange Line connection, Malden Center can serve as a temporary inbound terminus for the Haverhill Line when commuter rail service is disrupted between Malden and Boston's North Station. It served this role in 2016 during reconstruction work on the Woods Memorial Bridge, which carries the Revere Beach Parkway over the rail lines and the Malden River. Oak Grove station is usually used during weekday disruptions, as it is closer to the double-track section of the line in Melrose.

=== Renovations ===
Unlike most MBTA stations, air rights over the station are owned by the city rather than by the MBTA. By 1983, the city planned to build a footbridge to connect the station to nearby developments. In 1989, the MBTA studied a possible accessible footbridge at the station, which would have cost $2.8 million and opened in 1991.

The station was not initially accessible, but it was built with provisions for a future elevator. The MBTA began a renovation of the station, then estimated to cost $6 million, in 2003. It was originally to be completed in 2003, but was substantially delayed by changes to building codes. Completed in 2005, the ultimately-$10 million project added a second exit stairwell and two elevators, making the station accessible. In 2002, as part of its public art program, the MBTA added panels with artworks by local schoolchildren at Sullivan Square and Malden Center. The station also has two benches in the lobby painted by local arts students.

Malden Center was one of the ten high-ridership subway stations planned to receive new wayfinding signage, lighting, and other station improvements in 2019. Six of the station were completed in 2019 and 2020; designs were completed for Malden Center and three others, but they were not constructed due to a lack of available funding.

The entire Orange Line, including the Orange Line platform at Malden Center station, was closed from August 19 to September 18, 2022, during maintenance work. The Haverhill Line continued to stop at Malden Center during that time. Rail service on the inner Haverhill Line was suspended from September 9 to November 5, 2023, to accommodate signal work. The Encore Boston Harbor casino ran shuttles to Malden Center from its June 2019 opening until mid-2023.
