= Sullivan Square station =

Rapid transit station in Boston, Massachusetts, US

Sullivan Square
- A southbound train at the station in 2026

General information
- Location: Maffa Way and Cambridge Street; Charlestown, Boston, Massachusetts
- Coordinates: 42.38432°N 71.07686°W
- Line: Haymarket North Extension
- Platforms: 2 island platforms
- Tracks: 3 (Orange Line); 2 (commuter rail)
- Connections: MBTA bus: 85, 89, 90, 91, 92, 93, 95, 101, 105, 109; Lower Mystic Link

Construction
- Parking: 222 spaces ($6.00 fee)
- Cycle facilities: 16 spaces
- Accessible: Yes

History
- Opened: June 10, 1901 (elevated station)
- Rebuilt: April 7, 1975 (modern station)

Passengers
- FY2019: 8,305 daily boardings

Services
Preceding station	MBTA	Following station
Community College toward Forest Hills	Orange Line	Assembly toward Oak Grove
Former services at East Somerville B&M station
Preceding station	Boston and Maine Railroad	Following station
Boston Terminus	Medford Branch	Wellington toward Medford
Boston Terminus	Western Route	Edgeworth toward Portland
Boston Terminus	Eastern Route	Everett toward Portland
Former services at Charlestown Elevated station
Preceding station	MBTA	Following station
Thompson Square toward Forest Hills	Orange Line	Everett Terminus
Location

Sullivan Square station is a rapid transit station on the MBTA subway Orange Line, located adjacent to Sullivan Square in the Charlestown neighborhood of Boston, Massachusetts. It is a major transfer point for MBTA bus service, with 10 routes using a two-level busway. The station has two island platforms serving the two active Orange Line tracks plus an unused third track. The Haverhill Line and Newburyport/Rockport Line pass through the station on separate tracks but do not stop.

The Boston and Maine Railroad (B&M) opened through Sullivan Square in 1845, followed by the Eastern Railroad in 1854; both railroad had stations there. The B&M acquired the Eastern in 1885 and combined their stations as part of a grade crossing elimination project in 1900–01. That station served commuter trains until 1958. The Boston Elevated Railway opened its Sullivan Square station in June 1901 as the northern terminus of the Charlestown Elevated. The massive terminal served numerous streetcar lines as well as elevated trains.

The modern station opened in May 1975 as part of the Haymarket North Extension, which replaced the Charlestown Elevated; the old terminal was demolished the next year. Sullivan Square station was made accessible in the 1990s, and the busways were reconfigured in 2018–2019.

== Station layout ==
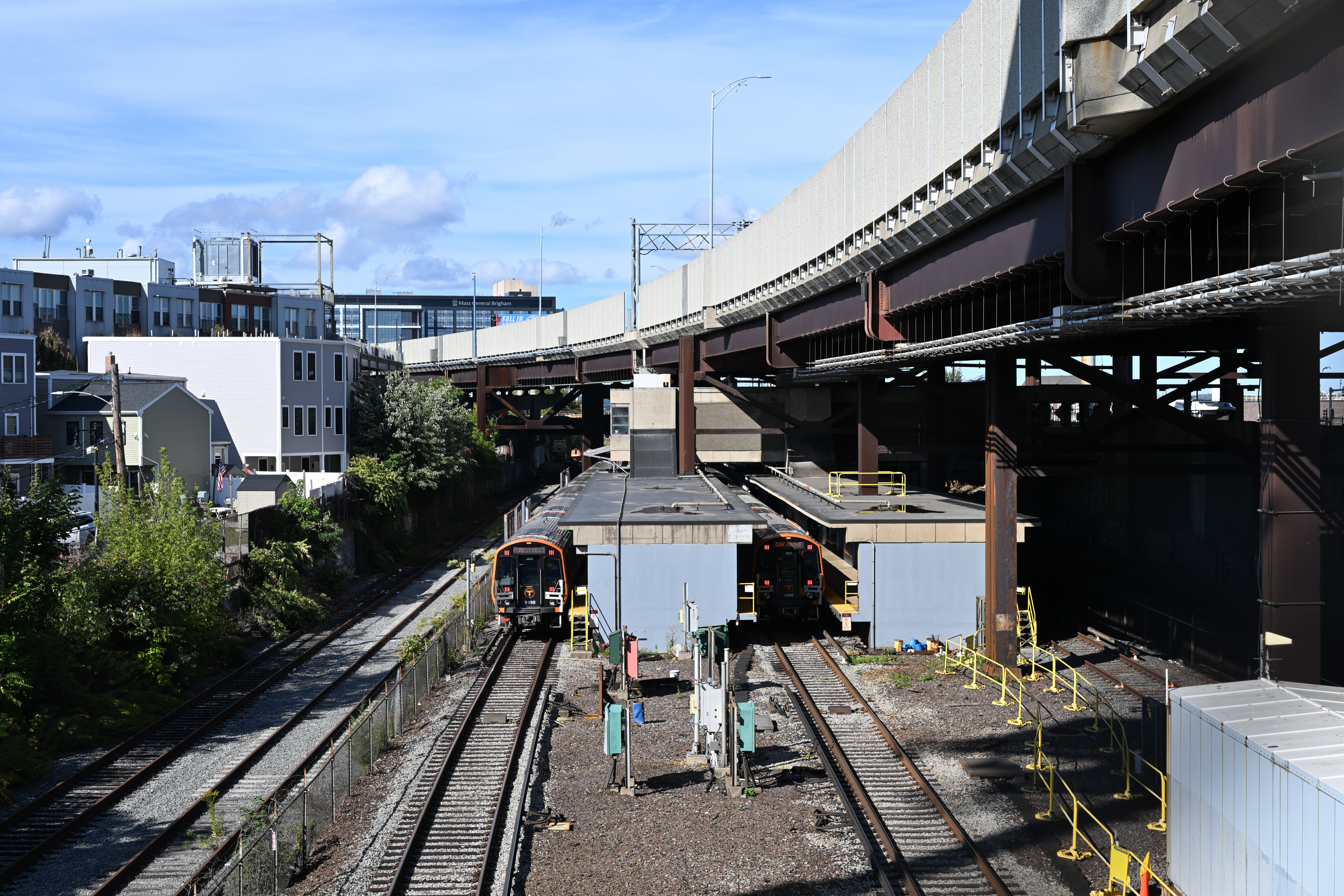
The station viewed from the south

Sullivan Square station is located in an open cut under the Interstate 93 viaduct just west of the Sullivan Square traffic circle. The cut has seven tracks: two freight yard tracks (Yard 21, with the tracks called 3rd Iron and 4th Iron) on the west, three Orange Line rapid transit tracks in the center, and two tracks used by MBTA Commuter Rail Haverhill Line and Newburyport/Rockport Line trains on the east. Only the west (southbound) and center (northbound) Orange Line tracks are used for revenue service; the unused east track, originally intended for express service, is only used for maintenance and testing. A pair of island platforms are located between the Orange Line tracks; the west platform serves trains in both directions, while the east platform serves only northbound trains.

The platforms have a "utilitarian" concrete design similar to Community College station. A mezzanine and fare lobby above the tracks is connected to the platforms with stairs, escalators, and elevators. The entrance is from the east side of the tracks, on the upper level of the two-level busway. East of the busways is a surface parking lot.

The busway has two lanes on the lower level and one on the upper level. A passageway leads from outside the station entrance under the upper busway to the lower busway. Sullivan Square is a major MBTA bus terminal, serving routes 85, 89, 90, 91, 92, 93, 95, 101, 105, and 109.

== History ==
=== Railroad stations ===
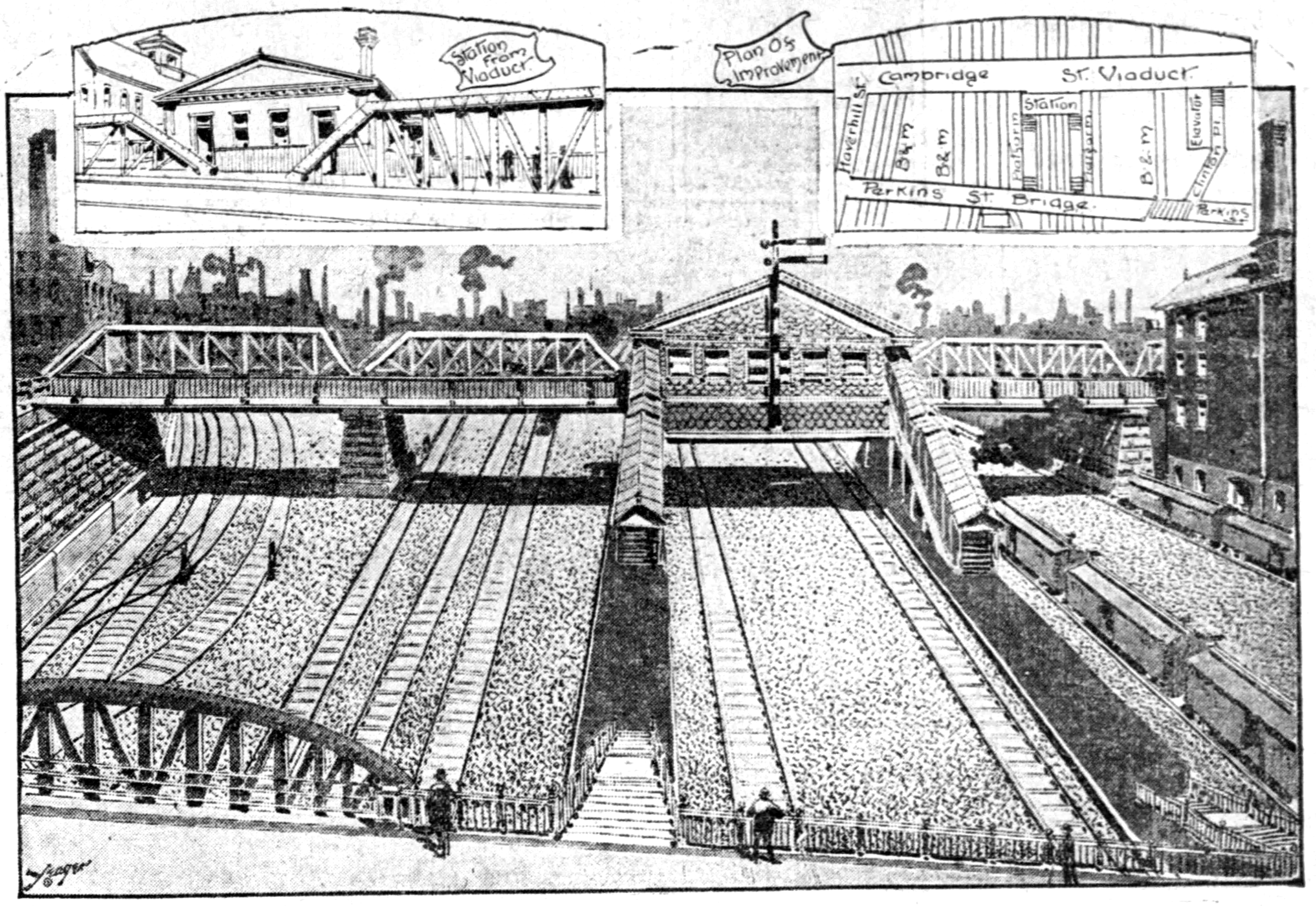
The new East Somerville station in 1901

The Boston and Maine Railroad (B&M) opened its new mainline just west of Sullivan Square on July 1, 1845. The parallel Grand Junction Railroad and Depot Company opened in 1849; passenger service on that line began on April 10, 1854 as the Eastern Railroad's entrance to Boston. Both railroads opened stations at Sullivan Square, both variously known as Somerville and East Somerville, with the beginning of passenger service or soon after. (While the stations were in Charlestown, they primarily served nearby Somerville. By 1875, the B&M station was located on the north side of Cambridge Street, with the Eastern station on the south side. The B&M acquired the Eastern in 1885 and initially continued to use both stations.

The wide grade crossing of Cambridge Street was a perennial safety issue, with 677 trains crossing the street each day. When electric streetcars were added on the street in 1895, they had to detour via neighborhood streets to use the Main Street (Broadway) bridge. In October 1895, the Massachusetts Superior Court issued orders to eliminate remaining grade crossings in Charlestown. Initial plans in 1896 called for Cambridge Street and Perkins Street to be cut at the tracks, with Brighton Street extended to Main Street, but this was unpopular with residents.

Construction began in mid-1900 on a more popular solution: Cambridge Street was raised onto a bridge over the tracks, Perkins Street was cut, with a footbridge in its place. As part of the project, the B&M constructed a new East Somerville station to replace the older stations. The station building was located over the tracks on the north side of Cambridge Street; two island platforms were reached by stairs from the station building and from the Perkins Street footbridge. The station opened for suburban traffic by June 1901, while the Cambridge Street bridge was completed that July.

The station building was closed in 1927 as short-distance passenger traffic declined, and was soon demolished. In February 1932, with just a few trains a day stopping, the railroad successfully petitioned the Public Utilities Commission to abandon the station entirely. However, the station remained in use, served by a small number of trains on both the Eastern Division and Western Division. On April 18, 1958, the Boston and Maine Railroad received permission from the Public Utilities Commission to drastically curtail its suburban commuter service, including abandoning branches, closing stations, and cutting trains. Among the approved cuts was the closure of all Eastern Division service south of Lynn, including the Saugus Branch plus mainline stations at East Somerville, Everett, Chelsea, and Forbes. The Saugus Branch and mainline stations were closed on May 16, 1958.

=== Elevated station ===
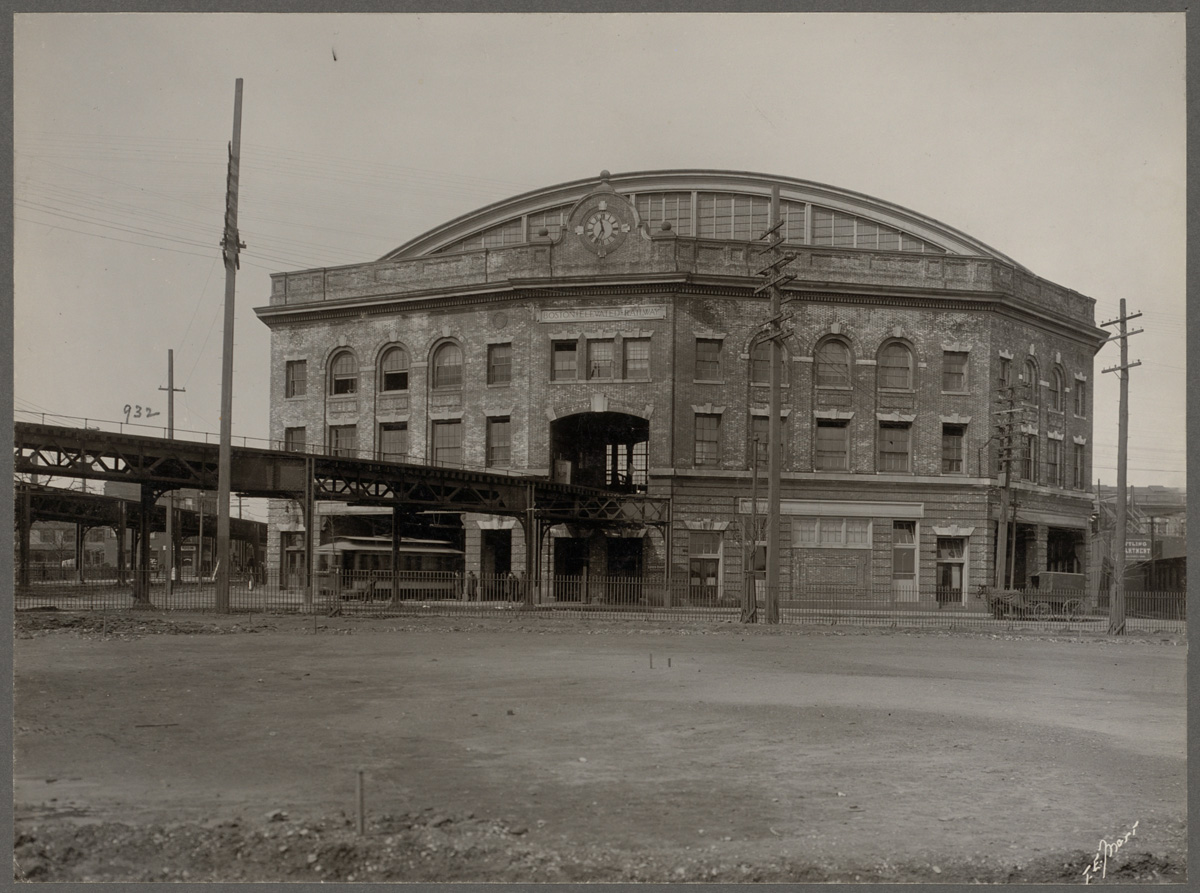
Exterior of the elevated station around 1910

The first rapid transit station at Sullivan Square opened on June 10, 1901 as part of the Charlestown Elevated rapid transit line, a predecessor to the modern Orange Line. The original elevated station was considered a crown jewel of the "El", along with a similar station complex at Dudley Square in Roxbury. The steel-and-brick structure was designed by Alexander Wadsworth Longfellow Jr. along with the other original elevated stations. It was a polygonal shape about 175 feet (53 m) square, with a glass trainshed spanning an open interior. Sullivan Square and its station are named for James Sullivan, an early 19th-century Governor of Massachusetts and first president of the Middlesex Canal Company.

The station was designed as a major transfer point, with many streetcar lines that had formerly gone downtown truncated to Sullivan. Surface streetcars ran up a ramp to ten stub-end tracks at the level of the elevated stations, allowing cross-platform transfers with elevated trains; lines not terminating at Sullivan used a surface-level loop. Lexington and Boston Street Railway cars from as far away as Lowell ran to Sullivan Square until May 4, 1912, when they were redirected to Harvard station. The 1912-built upper-level streetcar loop was demolished and rebuilt beginning on October 13, 1946, to handle new trackless trolleys. Streetcar lines continued to serve the station until the Fellsway Line was converted to bus in December 1955.

The MTA began charging for parking at its stations, including Sullivan Square, on November 2, 1953. Over time, deferred maintenance on the Charlestown Elevated and Sullivan Square station took its toll. A large fire also caused significant damage to the station's upper level on November 1, 1967, and the rail bending shop nearby was destroyed by a fire on January 4, 1975. The Charlestown Elevated closed on April 4, 1975.

By June 1975, some local officials and preservationists sought to preserve and renovate the old elevated station for commercial or recreational use. The MBTA issued a $387,000 contract for demolition of the Charlestown Elevated on June 11, 1975, but the $76,000 demolition of Sullivan Square was placed on hold for 45 days for city and state agencies to propose reuse. This deadline was later delayed to November. The station was ultimately demolished beginning in March 1976.

=== Modern station ===
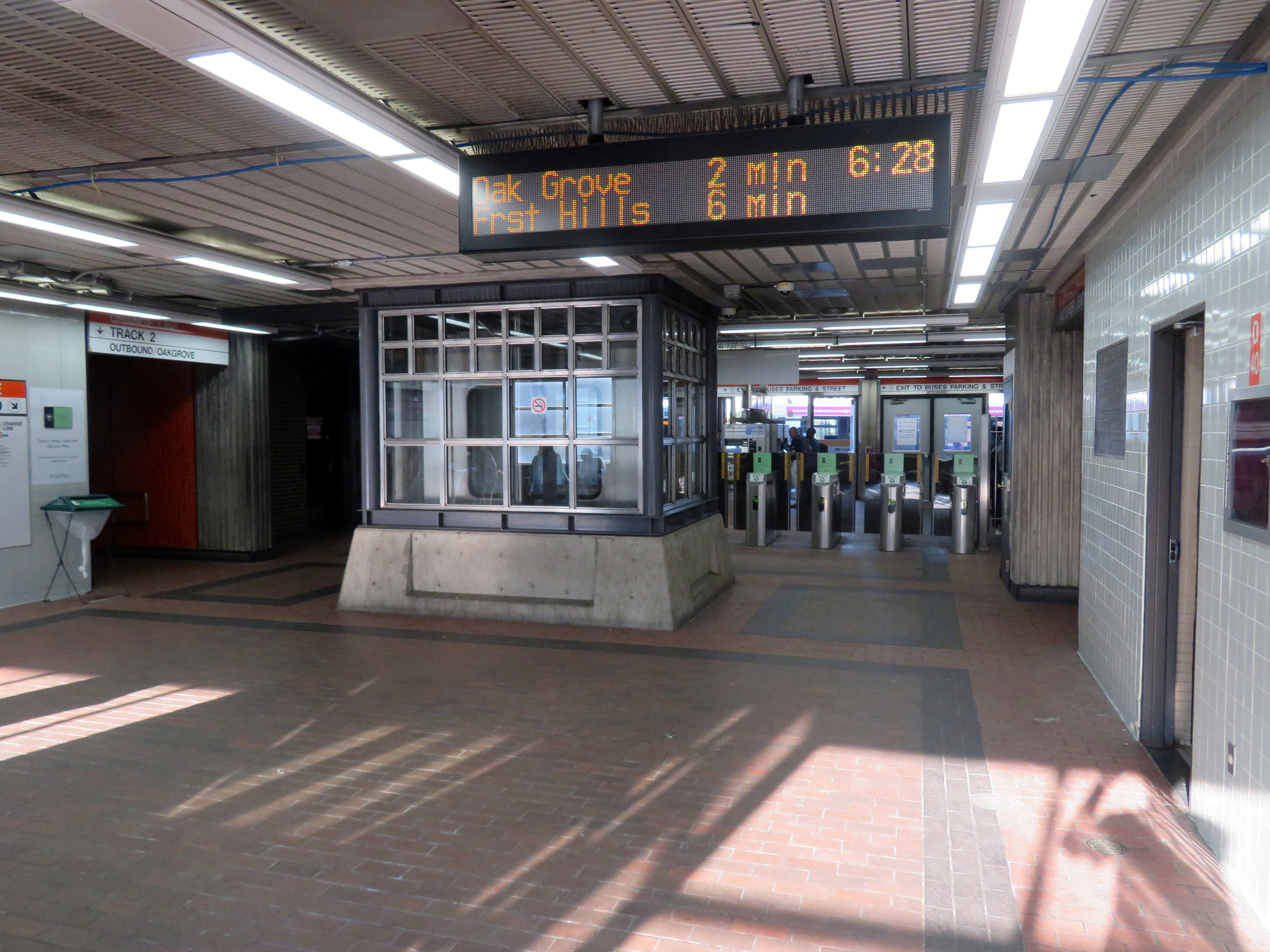
The mezzanine level of the modern station

The Haymarket North Extension was constructed in the early 1970s along the Haverhill Line right-of-way, with a relocated new Sullivan Square station under the elevated I-93 expressway. The Haymarket North Extension opened as far as Sullivan Square on April 7, 1975. The new Sullivan station was the terminus of the extension for five months until Wellington opened on September 6, 1975.

On January 20, 1984, a fire destroyed the wooden approach trestles to the North Station drawbridges. Most commuter rail trains began using a temporary terminal near Lechmere station. Ipswich/Rockport Line trains moved to a temporary platform at Sullivan Square on January 28 to ease congestion on the Green Line. North Station reopened on April 20, 1985; the temporary platform at Sullivan Square was closed.

Sullivan station was not originally accessible. Construction of elevators at Sullivan and Wellington took place in 1991–92. In 2002, as part of its public art program, the MBTA added panels with artworks by local schoolchildren at Sullivan Square and Malden Center. The concrete walls of the station trench are frequently covered by large graffiti works.

A 2018–2019 construction project, funded as part of environmental mitigation of the new Encore Boston Harbor casino, reconfigured Sullivan Square roadways and the station busways. The lower busway was divided into two lanes, and a new exit to Cambridge Street was added at the south end of the busways. Three short sections of bus-only turn lane on Beacham Street, Maffa Way, and Main Street were added for buses entering the station. Repairs to the platforms and canopies were bid in 2018 and completed in 2021. The entire Orange Line, including Sullivan Square station, was closed from August 19 to September 18, 2022, during maintenance work. Additional segments of bus lanes on Broadway, Mystic Avenue, and Lombardi Street were added around 2025 as part of a bridge reconstruction project.

==== Plans ====
Sullivan Square was a proposed stop on the Urban Ring – a circumferential bus rapid transit (BRT) line designed to connect the existing radial MBTA rail lines to reduce overcrowding in the downtown stations. Under draft plans released in 2008, Urban Ring buses would have used the existing bus loop, and a new platform would be built to serve the Haverhill and Newburyport/Rockport commuter rail lines. The project was cancelled in 2010 In March 2024, the MBTA announced plans to extend to Silver Line route SL3 from Chelsea to Sullivan via Everett Square.

A $10.5 million design contract for accessibility improvements at Arlington, North Station, and Sullivan Square was awarded in April 2020. The MBTA planned to add three elevators to the station, including an elevator to the lower busway. The work would also include replacement of the existing elevators, and two footbridges to connect the new elevators. Design reached 30% in 2021; by that time, the project scope had been reduced to remove the two new platform elevators and footbridges, leaving only the elevator replacements plus the new busway elevator. Design work was expected to reach 75% completion in 2022, but this did not occur; the project was paused pending availability of funding.

A 2013 city study called for air rights development, including parking garages and retail plus possible commercial structures, over the station parking lot and busways.
