= Encore Boston Harbor =

Resort and casino in Everett, Massachusetts

Coordinates: 42°23′40.06″N 71°4′12.73″W

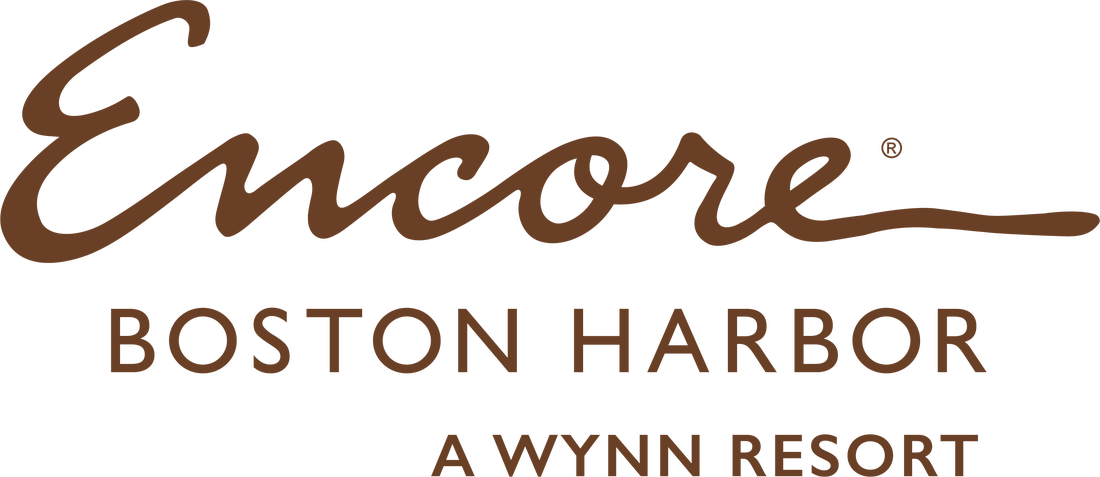

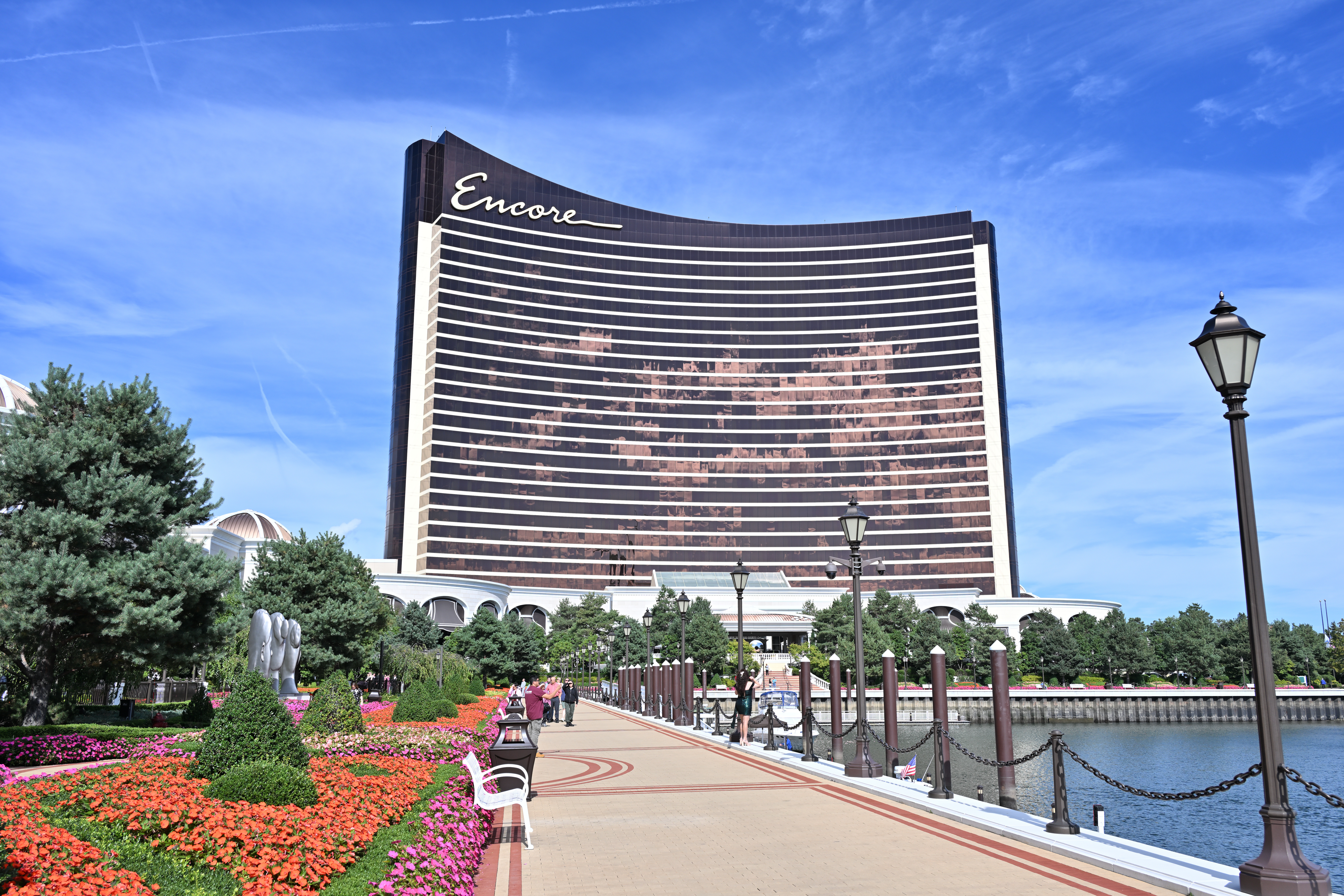
- The resort in September 2024
- Interactive map of Encore Boston Harbor
- Location: Everett, Massachusetts; One Broadway Everett, MA 02149 USA
- Opened: June 23, 2019; 7 years ago
- No. of rooms: 671
- Gaming space: 210,000 sq ft
- Signature attractions: The harborwalk, indoor gardens, retail, convention and wedding space
- Notable restaurants: Fratelli, Mystique, Cheese Meet Wine, Rare Steakhouse
- Casino type: Resort
- Owner: Realty Income
- Operating license holder: Wynn Resorts
- Previous names: Wynn Everett; Wynn Boston Harbor
- Website: EncoreBostonHarbor.com

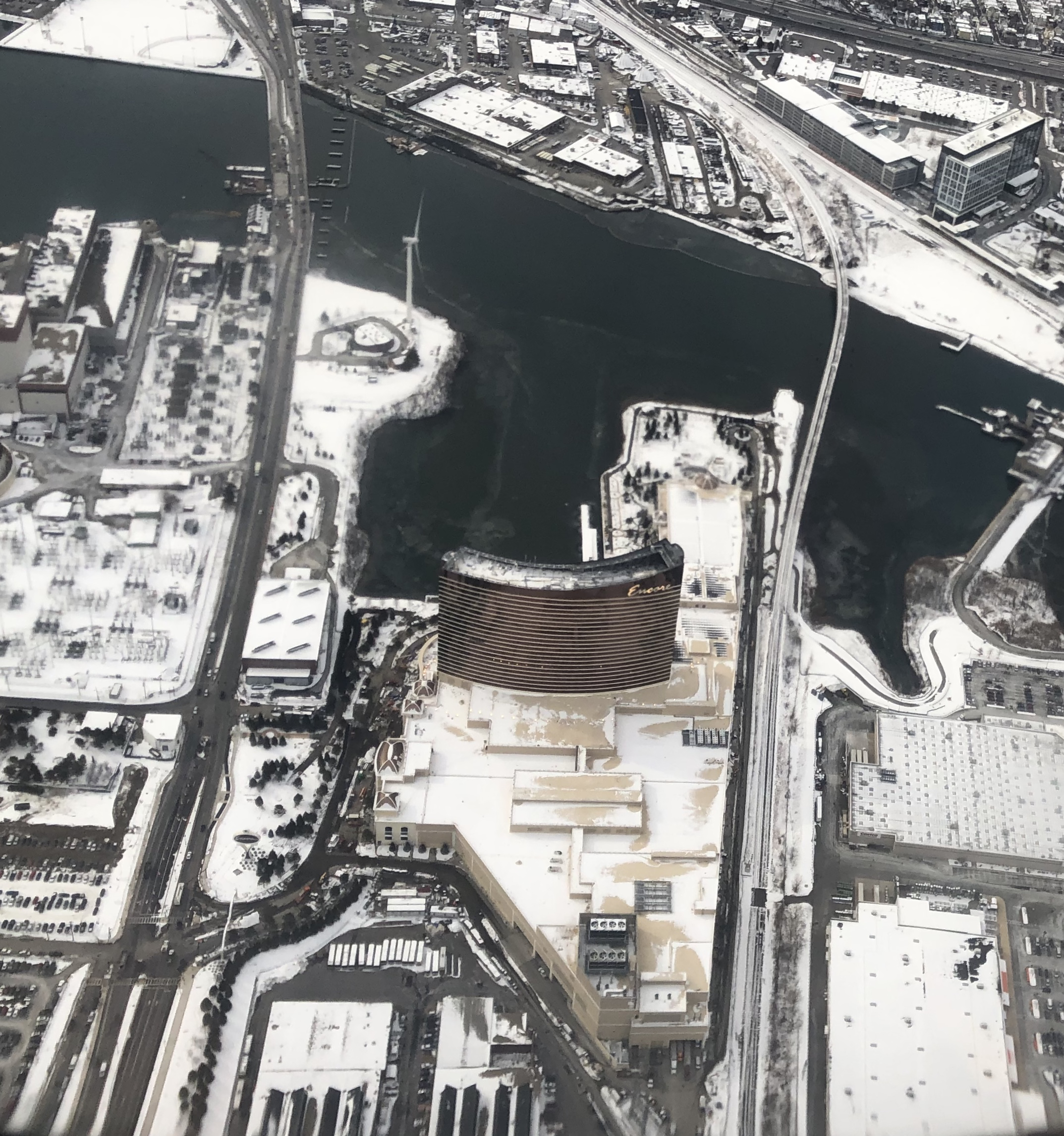
Encore Boston Harbor site on the Mystic River in February 2019

Encore Boston Harbor (previously referred to as Wynn Everett and Wynn Boston Harbor) is a luxury resort and casino located in Everett, Massachusetts (on the border with Boston). It is owned by Realty Income and operated by Wynn Resorts. The resort is in a commercial-industrial area on the Mystic River, about 5 miles (8.0 km) from downtown Boston. Its development rehabilitated a 33-acre parcel of land previously used for industrial purposes. It opened on June 23, 2019, at a total cost of $2.6 billion. After a remediation process to clean the site, Wynn Resorts constructed an integrated resort with a hotel, a harborwalk, restaurants, a casino, spa, retail outlets, and meeting and convention space. Public amenities of the year-round harborwalk include a picnic park, paths for bikers and pedestrians, viewing decks, waterfront dining and retail, a performance lawn, floral displays, boat docks, and public art.

== History ==
=== Background and owners (1800s–2010s) ===
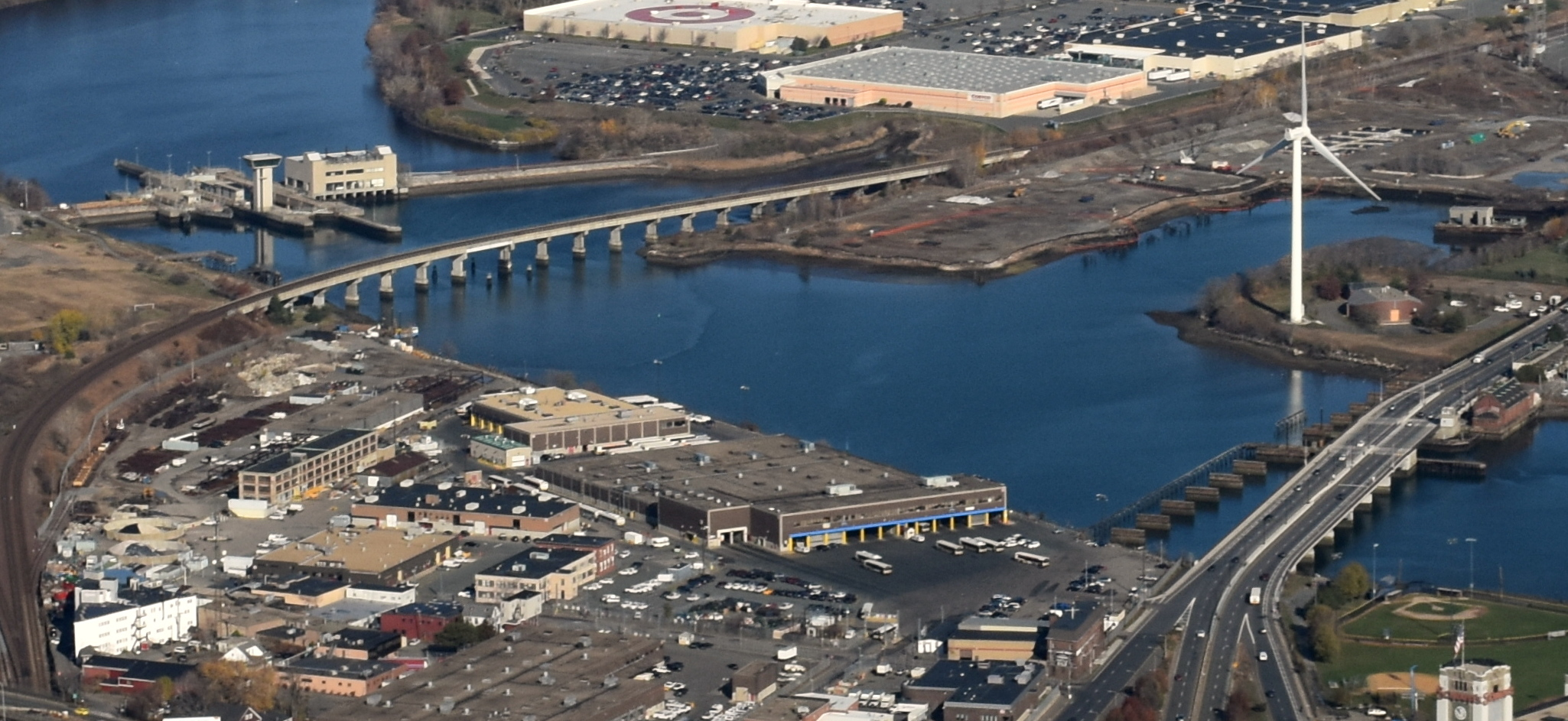
Aerial view of the Mystic River in November 2015. The undeveloped parcel in the upper-center of the image, between the railroad bridge (left) and the windmill (right), was used for industrial purposes in the 1800s, before being purchased for the casino in January 2015.

In January 2015, Wynn Resorts purchased 33 acres (13 ha) of land along the Mystic River in Everett, Massachusetts, and announced plans to build the resort-casino Wynn Everett on the plot. With the project later renamed Wynn Boston Harbor, around 30 of those acres had previously been set aside for industrial use and were inaccessible to the public for more than 100 years. A section of the plot had been known as White Island in the 1800s, with the island later becoming part of the mainland as backfill expanded the shoreline along the Mystic River. Prior to any backfill, as early as 1804 a dye house had been built on the land, which was later occupied by Cochrane Chemical Company.

Using a corner of White Island, in 1854 the Mystic River Bridge was built across the river. New England Chemical started a plant on the site in 1868, before going out of business in 1872. That year Cochrane Chemical Company purchased a portion of the plot adjacent to New England Chemical's former factory, with the Cochrane factory experiencing heavy use during World War I. The land was acquired by Merrimac Chemical Company in 1917. It became an industrial center used by Monsanto starting in 1929, with Monsanto selling the parcel to Boston Edison in 1983. Boston Edison retained the land until 1995, when the land and easements were purchased by O'Donnell Sand & Gravel. Afterwards ownership of the parcel was ceded to Rosen Construction Ventures in Florida. The site was subsequently primed for development, undergoing several other changes in ownership.

=== Casino proposal process (2011–2014) ===
In 2011, the government of Massachusetts enacted the Expanded Gaming Act, which permitted Las Vegas-style casino gaming in the state and established three territories, each of which could contain one licensed casino. The plot in Everett fell into the territory that also included the greater Boston area. A number of companies developed and pitched casino projects to the Massachusetts Gaming Commission subsequent to the Expanded Gaming Act, with Las Vegas-based Wynn Resorts selecting the Everett plot as its proposed location. Wynn Resorts brought in Robert J. DeSalvio to lead the Wynn Everett development process in March 2014, with DeSalvio to become the casino's president if the company won a license. DeSalvio had recently served as president of Sands Casino Resort Bethlehem and executive vice president of both Sands Atlantic City and Foxwoods Resort Casino. In June 2014, Wynn Resorts submitted its Final Environmental Impact Report, a final step in the proposal process. Voters in Massachusetts voted against a measure to repeal the casino law in July 2014, which maintained the legality of opening three casinos in the state.

=== Everett license awarded (2014) ===
In September 2014, the Massachusetts Gaming Commission voted 3–1 to approve Wynn Resorts' proposed $1.6 billion casino in Everett, and the license was formally approved with a 4–0 vote the next day. It was the singular casino license awarded in the eastern gaming region of Massachusetts, winning out over a $1.1 billion casino proposal by Mohegan Sun to rebuild the Suffolk Downs racetrack in Revere near Boston. That decision came after Wynn conceded to a number of requests by commissioners. Wynn Resorts also agreed to pay millions toward long-term plans to address traffic through Sullivan Square in Charlestown Part of the environmental cleanup plan for the area involved building a living ecosystem on the shoreline. Other aspects of the approved 26-acre proposal involved several thousand full-time jobs with salary averaging at $56,000. Wynn Resorts estimated that Wynn Everett would bring $260 million in annual tax revenue to the state of Massachusetts.

Wynn Resorts was awarded an official gaming license from the state to "develop and construct an integrated resort" in Everett in September 2014. The Wynn Everett development was estimated to cost a total of $1.6 billion, with a projected 2018 opening, later pushed to mid-2019. The license met with mixed reactions from local politicians. The Mayor of Everett Carlo DeMaria declared the decision "a tremendous day" for the city of Everett, adding that "I could not be any happier. We will no longer be the butt end of Boston, we'll be the entrance to the city of Everett." In contrast, Boston Mayor Marty Walsh called Wynn Resorts' offer to Boston "unacceptable," and in January 2015, the cities of Revere, Somerville, and Boston filed separate lawsuits against the gaming commission over the license, citing reasons such as traffic congestion. Wynn's rival bidder Mohegan Sun also sued the commission, demanding a do-over of the casino license competition.

=== Land purchase and remediation (2015) ===
On January 5, 2015, Wynn Resorts spent $35 million purchasing 33 acres of land along the Mystic River in Everett, announcing plans to develop "an integrated resort containing a hotel, restaurants, casino, spa, premium retail offerings, meeting and convention space and a waterfront harborwalk." The sale severed the parcel's connections to the previous owners, who had overseen its use by Monsanto and other chemical companies. Wynn Resorts unveiled Wynn Everett's new design to state regulators on January 15, 2015, displaying a bronze glass hotel tower with 24 floors and two large indoor gardens. The hotel included more than 600 rooms, or about 100 more rooms than originally proposed. Other new changes included a meeting and convention space in place of a previously planned nightclub along the retail esplanade. Wynn Resorts and the city of Everett were preparing for construction hires by the middle of May 2015, with DeSalvio stating at a job fair that "even though we're a number of months away (from construction), we wanted to hit the ground running and get started."

In August 2015, Wynn Resorts released a new rendering of the harborwalk, which will connect the resort with the neighboring Gateway Center Park. Towards the end of August, Wynn Everett received an environmental certificate from the state of Massachusetts after a three-year process to meet the guidelines of the Massachusetts Environmental Protection Act (MEPA). On September 10, Wynn Resorts rolled in equipment and workers to begin site preparation and pre-construction activities. Wynn Everett received final unanimous approval from the City of Everett Planning Board on September 28, 2015. The vote allowed Wynn to apply for building permits. Site remediation officially started in the third week of October, with Charter Contracting Company, LLC hired to conduct the initial four-month cleanup process. Wynn Resorts paid the $30 million estimated remediation costs directly, as compared to using public funds. By November 10, 2015, Wynn Resorts announced it had "awarded more than $3 million in contracts to certified veteran-owned businesses" in the resort's design phase, equaling 6.2% of the entire design-phase expense.

=== Employment and Boston "treaty" (2015–2016) ===
Wynn Resorts described the project as progressing on schedule by early 2016, with Wynn Everett described as "the largest private single-phase construction project in the history of the Commonwealth of Massachusetts." Wynn Resorts stated that the construction process would create 4,000 union trade jobs "that cover 10 million total work hours," with 4,000 permanent operational jobs to be created for the 2019 opening. On January 19, 2016, Suffolk Construction Company was announced as the general contractor. Beyond several casinos, Suffolk had previously constructed projects such as the Mandarin Oriental, Liberty Hotel, and the Boston Opera House.

After Boston led an "aggressive legal effort" to earn status as the Wynn project's host community, because the only road entrance to the site passes through the city of Boston (a small piece of Charlestown across the Mystic River from the bulk of the neighborhood). The November 2015 dismissal of Boston's lawsuit resulted in personal negotiations between Wynn and Boston mayor Walsh. A "treaty" between Steve Wynn and Walsh was officially approved by state gambling regulators in February 2016, with Boston entering into a Surrounding Community Agreement with Wynn. Afterwards, Boston's legal counsel announced that "from this point forward, Wynn's success is the city of Boston's success and vice versa, and we look forward to our new relationship."

=== Delay and pre-construction (2016) ===
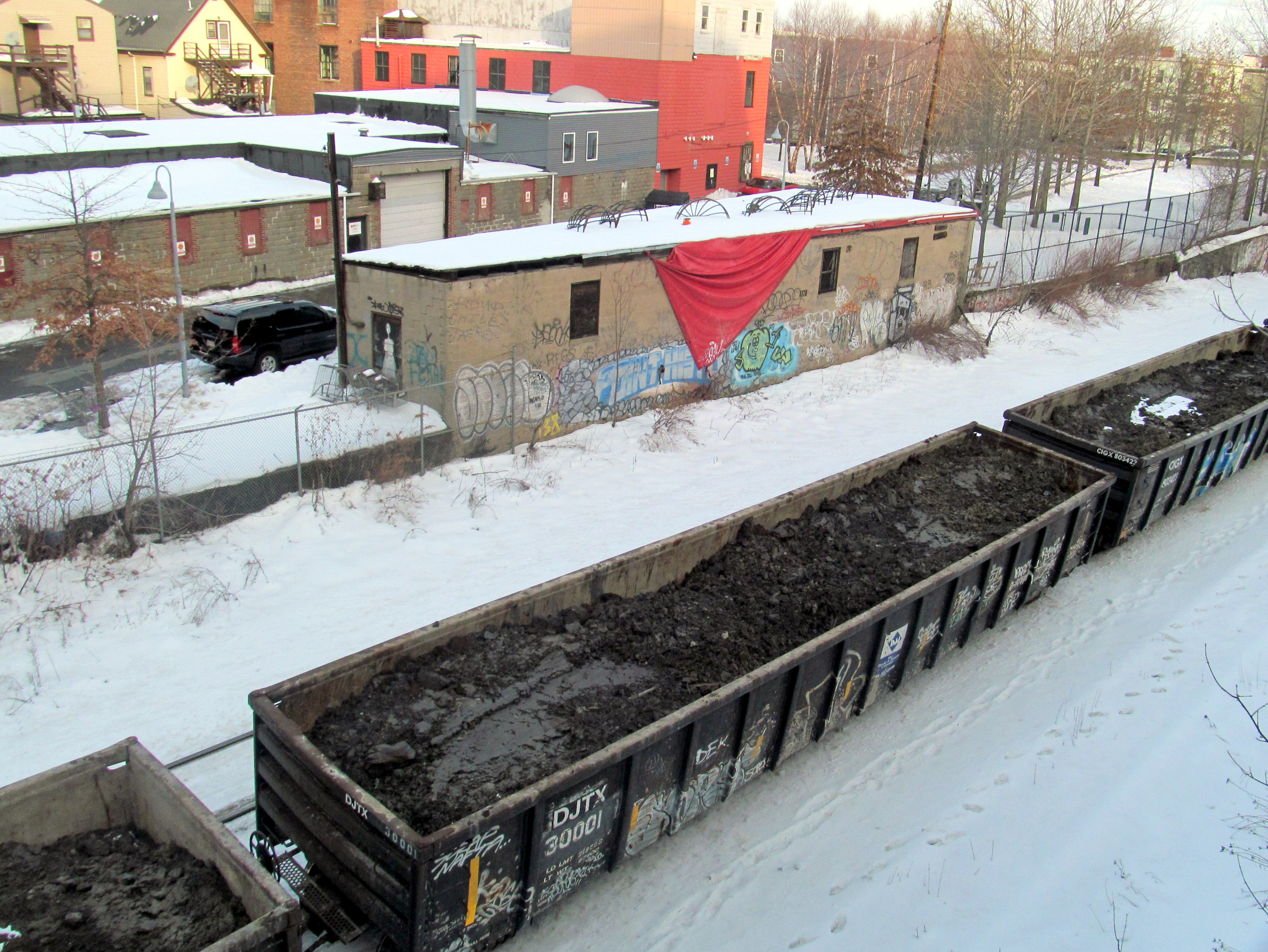
"Dirty dirt" train carrying contaminated soil from the construction site for disposal, photographed in February 2017

In February 2016, Somerville filed an administrative appeal questioning Wynn Everett's 2015 environmental permit from the Department of Environmental Protection, with the press reporting that the appeal could potentially delay Wynn Everett for a year. Somerville had four other legal challenges pending against the project at the time, including a legal appeal "challenging the state's issuance of a key environmental permit [to Wynn Everett]," which had temporarily stalled remediation the month prior. Although Curtatone defended the legal basis of his appeal in an op-ed, a Wynn Resorts spokesperson stated that the February appeal demonstrated Somerville Mayor Joseph Curtatone's "disrespect for the exhaustive work done by many state agencies in issuing this permit," accusing Curtatone of putting "personal political ambition" above job creation.

By February 2016, construction on Wynn Everett was scheduled to start in April. On February 24, however, construction was put on hold pending the Somerville appeal. The construction hold, according to Wynn Resorts, halted the hiring of up to 4,000 people and would "cost Massachusetts $55 million every month the project is delayed," equaling about "$660 million a year in economic benefits for the state," including $170 million in payroll and $248 million in goods and services to operate and maintain the resort. DeSalvio stated to the press that despite the delay the project was otherwise unaffected, with the building to be started "as soon as possible." Steve Wynn revealed details about the project, including the working name of Wynn Boston Harbor, in March 2016. Revealing a 100 square foot model of the resort, Wynn asserted they were aiming for a July groundbreaking, with the cost of the project upped from $1.7 to $2 billion.

Construction began in earnest after the City of Somerville dropped its appeal in August 2016.

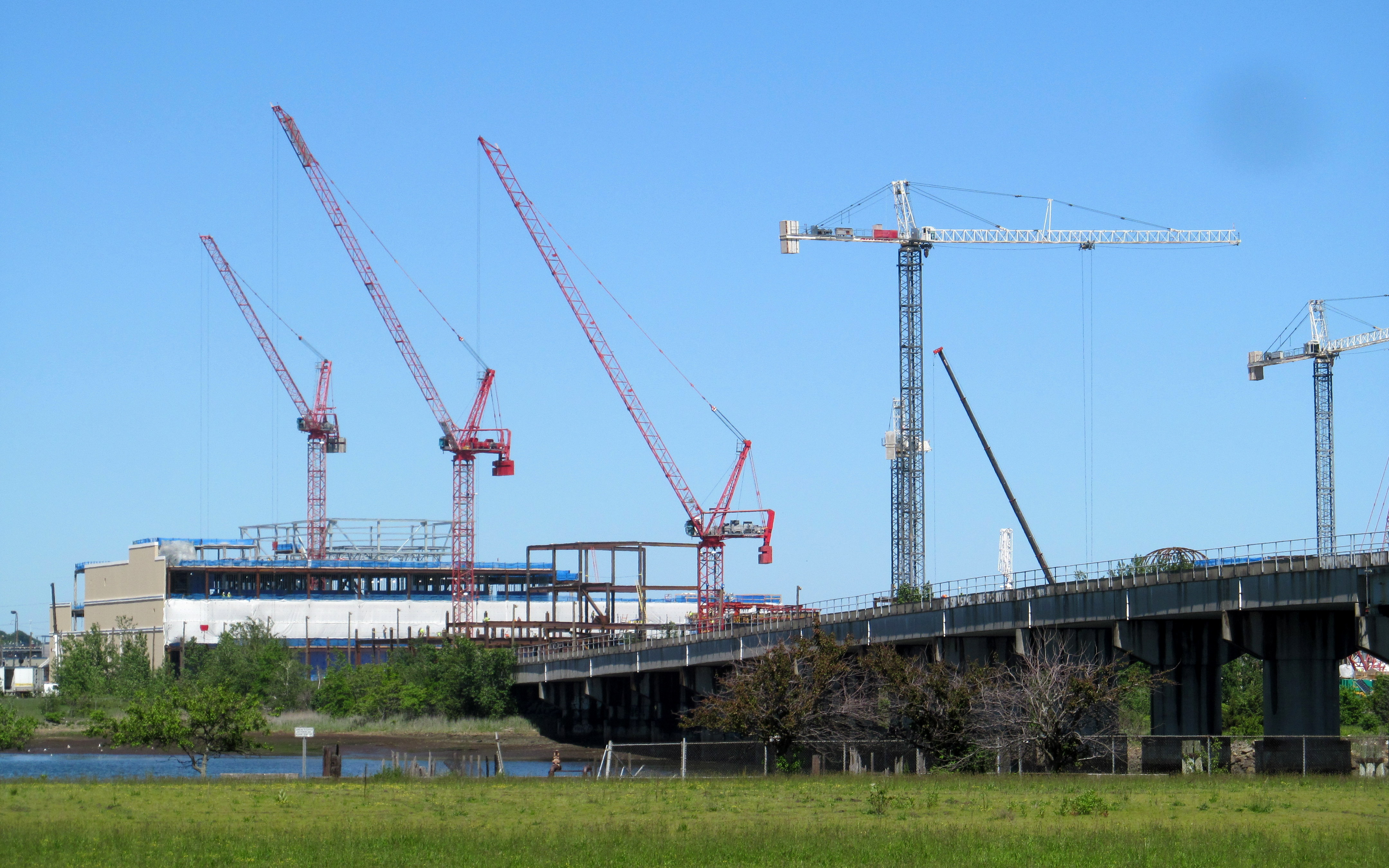
Under construction in 2017

=== Massachusetts Gaming Commission probe ===
In 2018, a number of sexual misconduct allegations were made against Steve Wynn, resulting in his departure from Wynn Resorts. The Gaming Commission opened an investigation of the allegations, leading the company to consider selling the under-construction casino, in case the investigation led to a negative outcome. The name of the project was changed to Encore Boston Harbor as part of an effort by Wynn Resorts to distance itself from its founder.

In April 2019, the Massachusetts Gaming Commission assessed a $35 million fine for failing to disclose years of sexual misconduct allegations against Wynn Resorts, but cleared the way for the casino to open on June 23, 2019. A $500,000 fine was also levied against CEO Matthew Maddox.

In 2022, Wynn sold the land and buildings to Realty Income in a leaseback transaction for $1.7 billion. Wynn continued to operate the property, paying $100 million in annual rent.

=== Expansion attempt ===
As of May 2024, Wynn was negotiating with the city of Everett in hopes of building a $400 million expansion of gaming, restaurant, and nightclub space on the east side of Broadway, connected by an overhead walkway. Wynn has already purchased for $25 million 45 acres of land from Constellation Energy, where Mystic Generating Station is being decommissioned.

== Features ==
=== Design and architecture ===
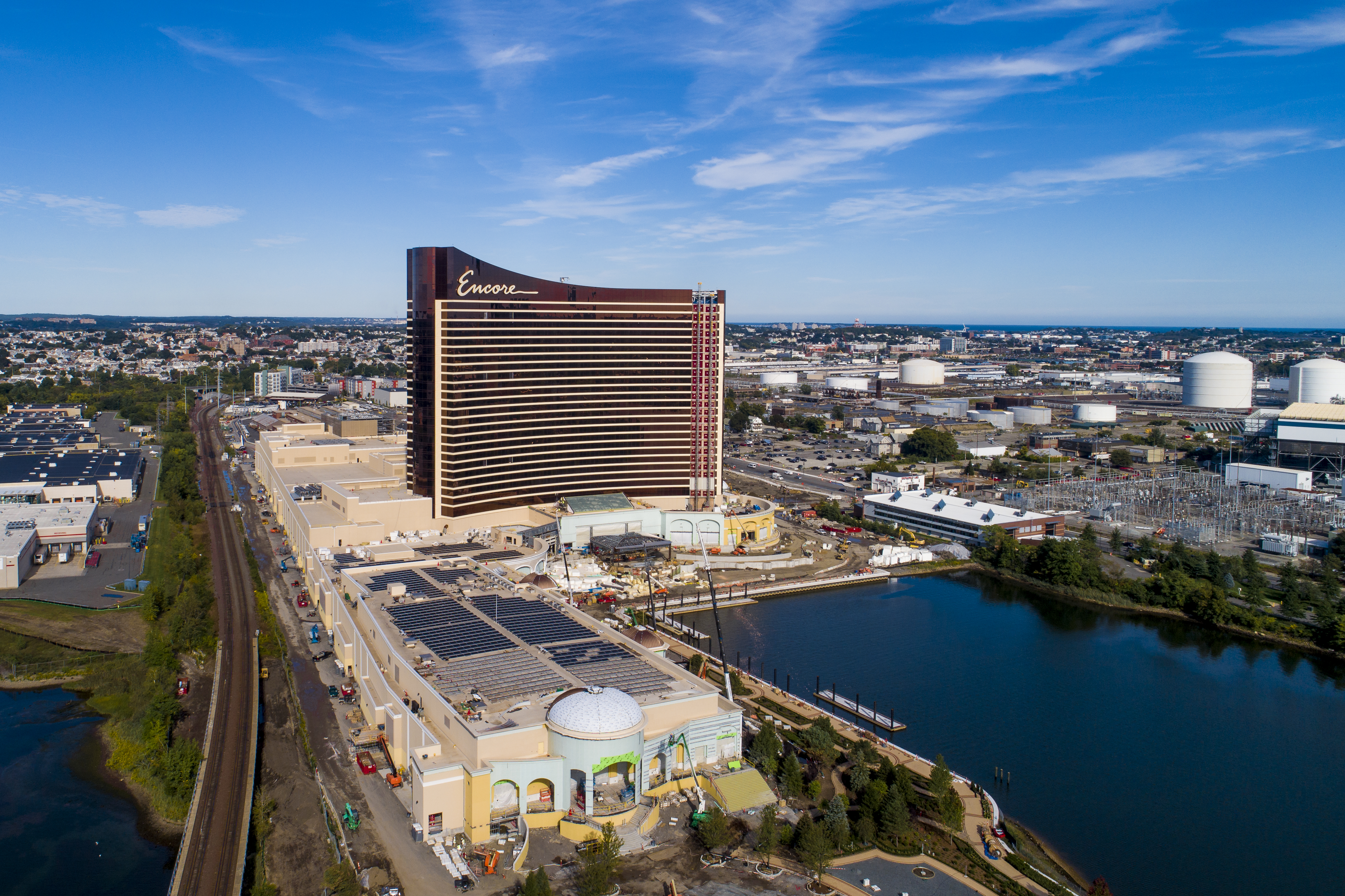
Encore Boston Harbor under construction in September 2018, with a view of the surrounding area

The $2.5 billion Encore Boston Harbor resort and casino was completed in 2019. According to the Encore Boston Harbor website, the 33-acre development is "the largest private single-phase construction project in the history of the Commonwealth of Massachusetts." With construction by Suffolk Construction Company and design by Wynn Resorts, the bronze-toned glass tower has 27 above-ground floors and tops out at 319 feet (97 m). With 671 rooms, the building houses a hotel and gaming area as well as a five-star spa, meeting, and event space with a grand ballroom, while the lobby used to feature a 2,000-pound (910 kg) sculpture of Popeye by artist Jeff Koons, which Steve Wynn purchased at auction for $28.2 million specifically for the location. In December 2019, the U.S. Green Building Council certified the 1,753,705-square-foot (162,924.5 m^{2}) building as LEED Platinum. The resort was the final project designed by legendary casino designer Roger Thomas, whose work with Steve Wynn included designing The Mirage, The Bellagio, Treasure Island, Beau Rivage and the entire Wynn portfolio of resorts.

There are approximately 2,900 parking spots, all of which are free of charge. The 671 hotel rooms in the main Encore Boston Harbor tower have three types: the multi-room "apartment suites," the "harborview suites" with panoramic views of the Boston skyline, and the "deluxe resort" rooms. With an average area of 650 square feet (60 m^{2}), Wynn Resorts claims the deluxe rooms have the "largest standard hotel room size in Boston".

=== Interior attractions and venues ===
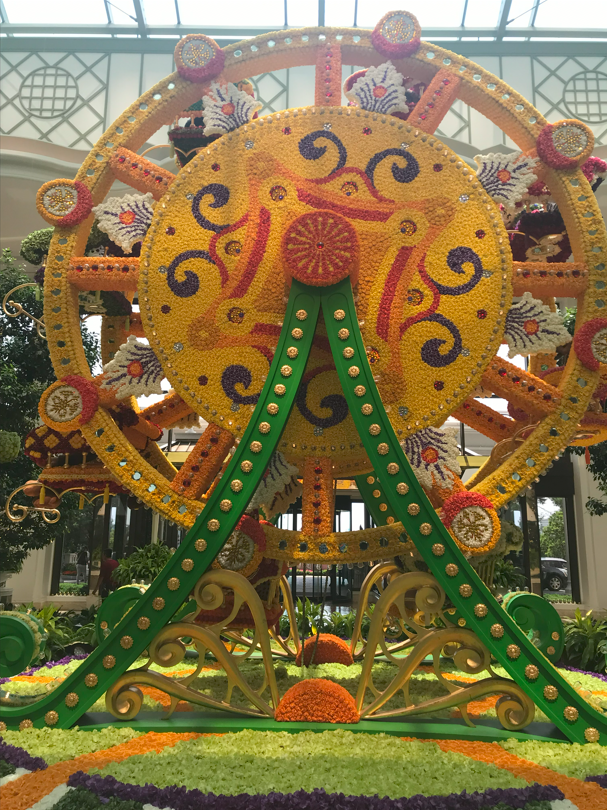
A flower garden and a large wheel is a popular tourist attraction for visitors of the hotel.

The resort features a number of venues, retail outlets, and other attractions beyond a hotel, including a casino, thirteen restaurants, a sports bar, a spa, and space for meetings and weddings. As with other Wynn Resorts developments such as Wynn Las Vegas, Encore Boston Harbor includes a strip of luxury retail shops. The gaming areas of the development includes poker tables, slot machines, and other table games.

The casino and hotel houses tens of millions of dollars' worth of original paintings, sculptures, and mosaics.

=== Restaurants ===
The following bars and restaurants remain from opening day:

- Rare (steakhouse)
- Mystique (Asian/fusion)
- Waterfront (craft beer), by chef John Ross of Neptune
- Bru (cafe)
- Red 8 (Asian), chef Ivan Yuen
- Fratelli (Italian), by Frank DePasquale of Bricco and Nick Varano of Strega
- Dunkin' (coffee/donuts)
- Garden Cafe (cafe)
- Garden Lounge (lounge)
- On Deck (sports bar), serving local beers, milkshakes, and burgers
- Memoire (nightclub)
- Center Bar (bar)

Additions since opening day include:

- Shake Shack
- Frank's & Nick's
- Cheese Meet Wine

Former restaurants no longer in operation include:

- Oyster Bar (raw bar), by chef John Ross of Neptune
- The Buffet
- Sinatra (Italian), similar to Wynn Las Vegas

=== Harborwalk and exterior attractions ===
The development features the harborwalk, which includes a public park and boardwalk situated between the Encore Boston Harbor skyscraper and the waterfront of the Mystic River. The boardwalk opened the waterfront to public use for the first time in over a century. In August 2015, Wynn Resorts stated that it intended the harborwalk to be "Boston's most magnificent outdoor gathering spot." Public amenities include a picnic park, paths for bikers and pedestrians, viewing decks, waterfront restaurants and retail, a performance lawn, floral displays, and boat docks.

=== Transportation ===
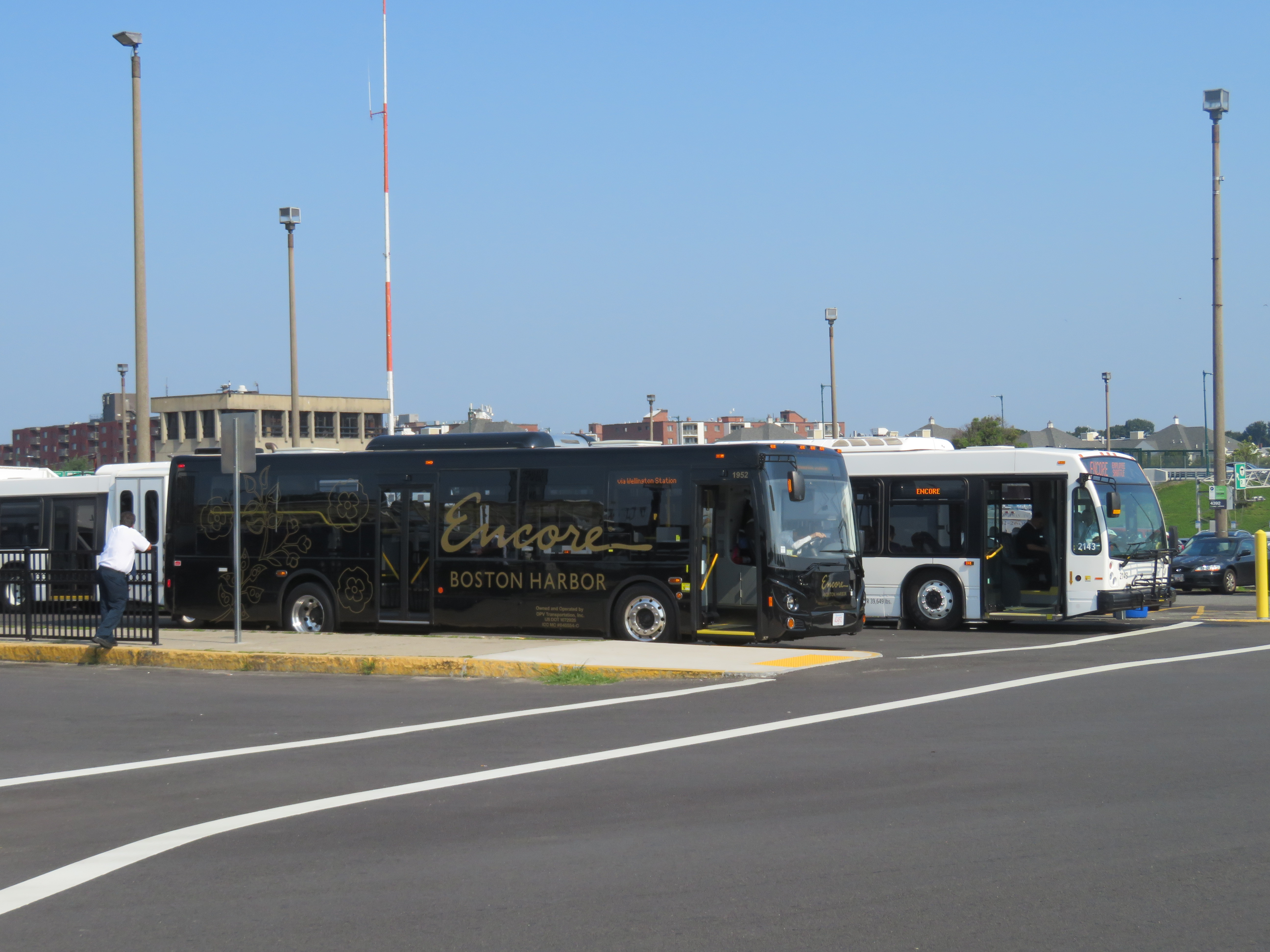
Encore shuttle buses

In 2014, casino also announced plans for a water taxi service to bring individual guests to anywhere in Boston Harbor, and a public boat dock for private boats. This water taxi took the form of a ferry service with free rides to and from Long Wharf North in Downtown Boston, running Fridays through Saturdays year-round. The service formerly ran to the Seaport. The harborwalk and trails connect pedestrians with the neighboring Gateway Center Park, Wynn Resorts also agreed to subsidize the Orange Line that crosses over the river from nearby Somerville to Medford, paying for improvements at the nearby Sullivan Square station and Wellington station. Wynn operates free shuttles to South Station in Downtown and weekend shuttles to the town of Quincy, south of Boston. The MBTA operates bus line 109 linking the bus stop Broadway @ Dexter Street in front of the resort to Orange Line Sullivan Square and to Harvard.

Though in the opening weeks, parking was $22–$42 for 6–24 hours, parking was made free in October 2019. The garage includes free parking for bicycles, and bikes are allowed on the harborwalk.

Wynn has proposed contributing funds for a new bicycle and pedestrian bridge across the Mystic River. The bridge would cross the Mystic River between the casino and Assembly station on the Orange Line in Somerville (which would require the addition of an east-facing entrance to the station) is under design with funding from the Massachusetts Gaming Commission. As of October 2019, negotiations are underway on access rights and construction funding, which might come from the casino, the gaming commission, the MBTA, or the cities of Everett or Somerville.

== See also ==
- List of casino hotels
- Gambling in Massachusetts
- List of integrated resorts
