= Oak Grove station =

Transit station in Malden, Massachusetts, US

Oak Grove
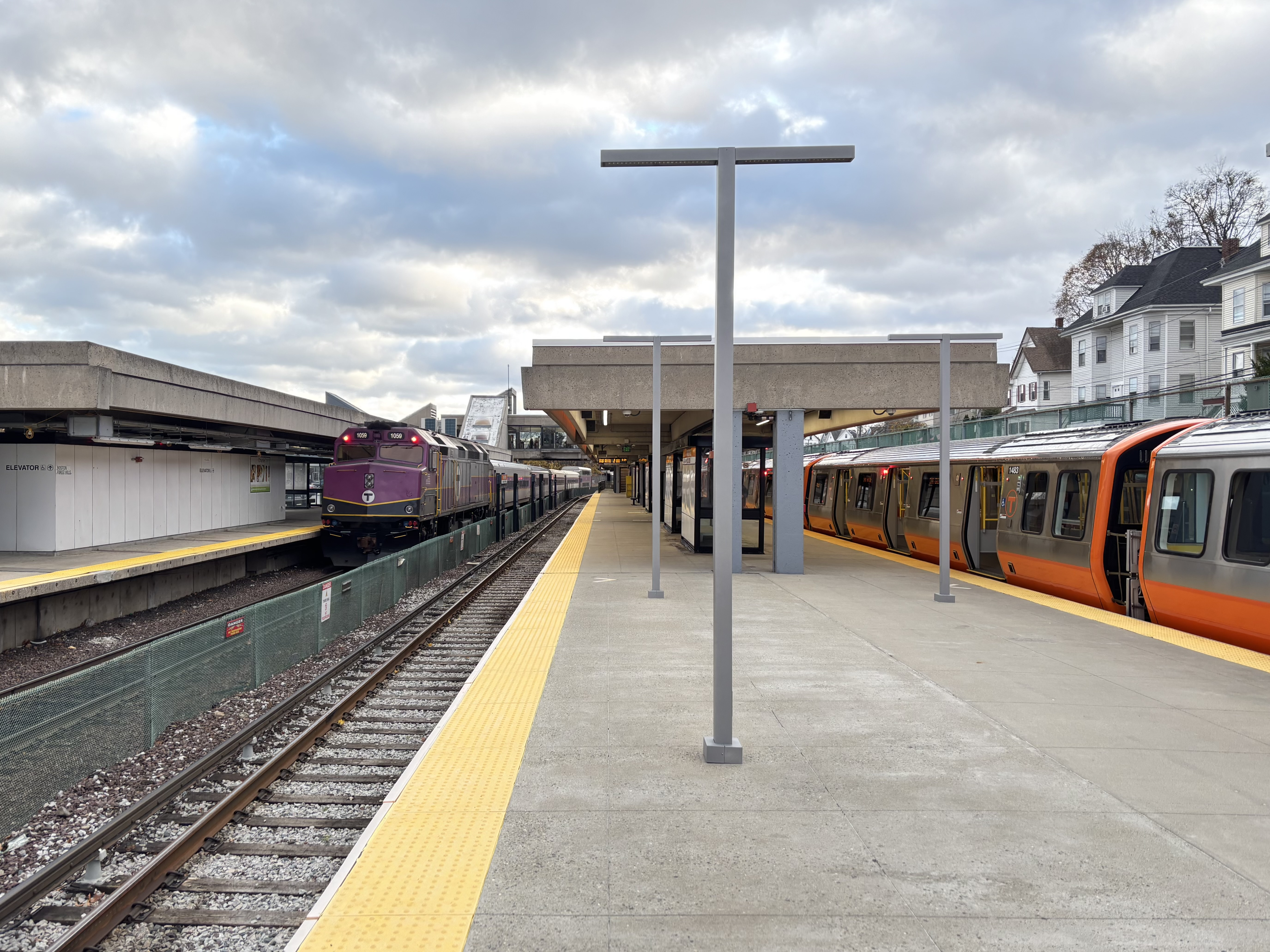
- Commuter Rail and Orange Line trains at the station in 2025

General information
- Location: Washington Street at Winter Street; Malden, Massachusetts
- Coordinates: 42.43694°N 71.07089°W
- Lines: Haymarket North Extension; Western Route
- Platforms: 1 island platform (Orange Line); 1 side platform (Commuter Rail)
- Tracks: 2 (Orange Line); 1 (Commuter Rail)
- Connections: MBTA bus: 131, 132, 137

Construction
- Parking: 788 spaces ($9 fee / $3 fee on weekends)
- Cycle facilities: 140 spaces in "Pedal and Park" bicycle cage
- Accessible: Yes

Other information
- Fare zone: 1A (Commuter Rail)

History
- Opened: March 19, 1977 (Orange Line)

Passengers
- 2024: 38 daily boardings (Haverhill Line)
- FY2019: 6,637 daily boardings (Orange Line)

Services
Preceding station	MBTA	Following station
Malden Center toward Forest Hills	Orange Line	Terminus
Malden Center toward North Station	Haverhill Line	Wyoming Hill toward Haverhill
Location

Oak Grove station is a Massachusetts Bay Transportation Authority (MBTA) intermodal transit station in the northern section of Malden, Massachusetts, just south of the Melrose border. It is the northern terminus of the rapid transit Orange Line and a stop on the Haverhill Line commuter rail service. The accessible station has a 788-space park and ride lot and is served by three MBTA bus routes.

The Boston and Maine Railroad opened through Malden in 1845, and a stop at Oak Grove was added by the 1870s. It closed in 1958 amid a series of cuts. The MBTA opened the modern station in March 1977 as the northern terminus of the Haymarket North Extension of the Orange Line. It also temporarily served as the southern terminus of Haverhill Line service in 1984–85 after a bridge fire at North Station. Renovation work on the Orange Line platform, including a new emergency exit ramp, took place in 2013–14. Three new elevators were added in 2019–2022, with one existing elevator replaced. Haverhill Line resumed stopping at the station during a 2022 closure of the Orange Line; Oak Grove was retained as a stop after.

== Station layout ==
Orange Line (left) and Haverhill Line platforms

Oak Grove has a single island platform serving the two tracks of the Orange Line. Terminating trains use both tracks, changing tracks at a crossover just south of the station. A single side platform serves the Haverhill Line track on the east side of the Orange Line. A fare lobby is located over the tracks at the south end of the station. It has entrances from Washington Street on the west and Banks Place on the east, with elevators to the lobby from both entrances and the Orange Line platform for accessibility.

Three MBTA bus routes serve Oak Grove station. Routes 131 and 137 use a dedicated busway in the parking area on the east side of the station, while route 132 runs on Washington Street on the west side of the station.

== History ==
=== Former station ===
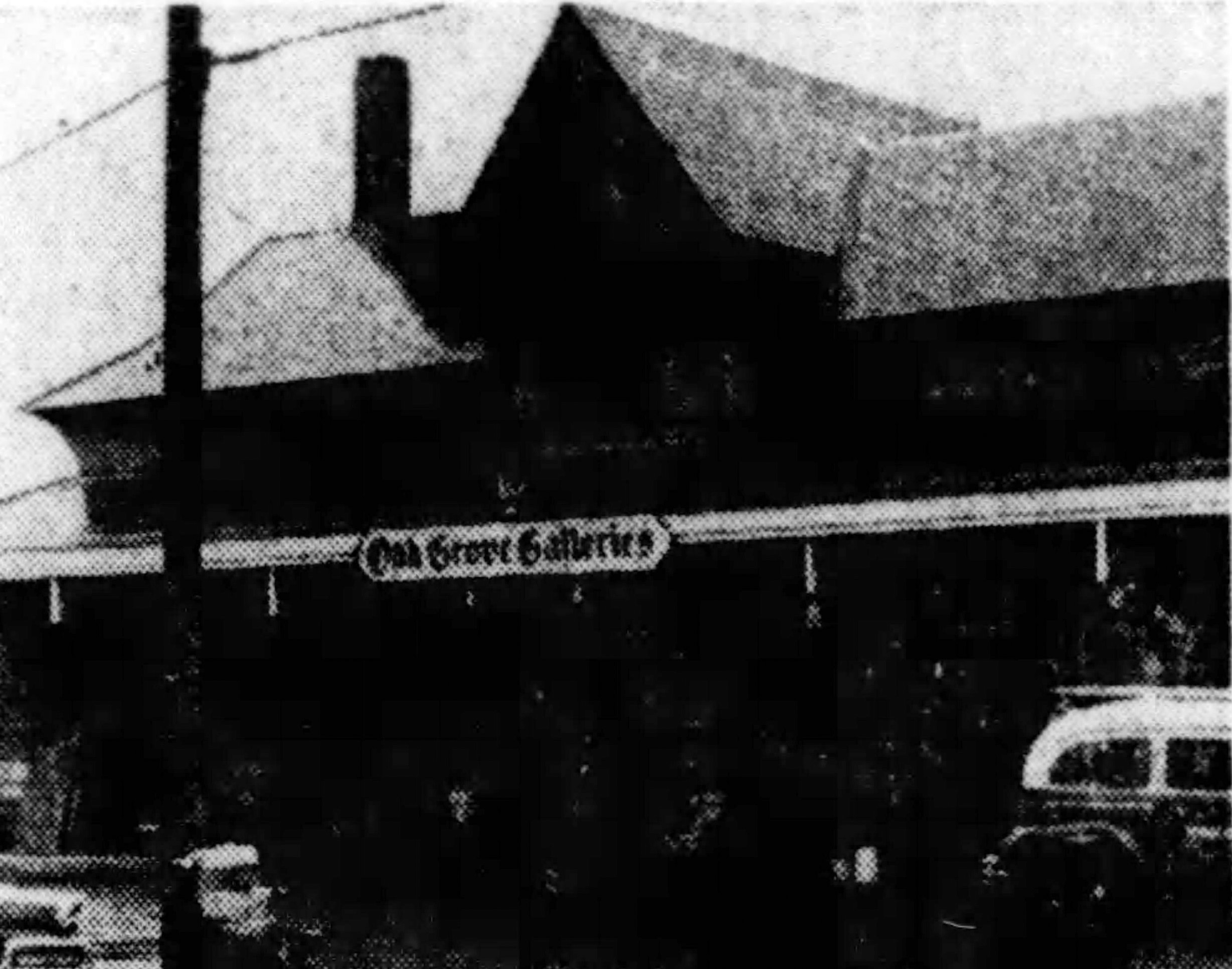
The former station building in 1962

The Boston and Maine Railroad (B&M) opened its mainline from Wilmington Junction to Boston on July 1, 1845, allowing it to operate independently of the Boston and Lowell Railroad. Oak Grove was not initially a stop on the line, but was in service by 1859. The two-story wooden station building, located on the west side of the tracks just south of Oak Grove Court, had a prominent central gable. The Western Route became a busy commuter line, but service declined after World War I, and again after World War II.

On April 18, 1958, the Public Utilities Commission approved a vast set of cuts to Boston and Maine Railroad commuter service, including all stations on the Western Route south of Wyoming Hill save for Malden. The stations were closed on May 18, 1958, amid the first of a series of cuts. The Oak Grove station building was reused as an antique store by 1962, and was later demolished.

=== MBTA station ===
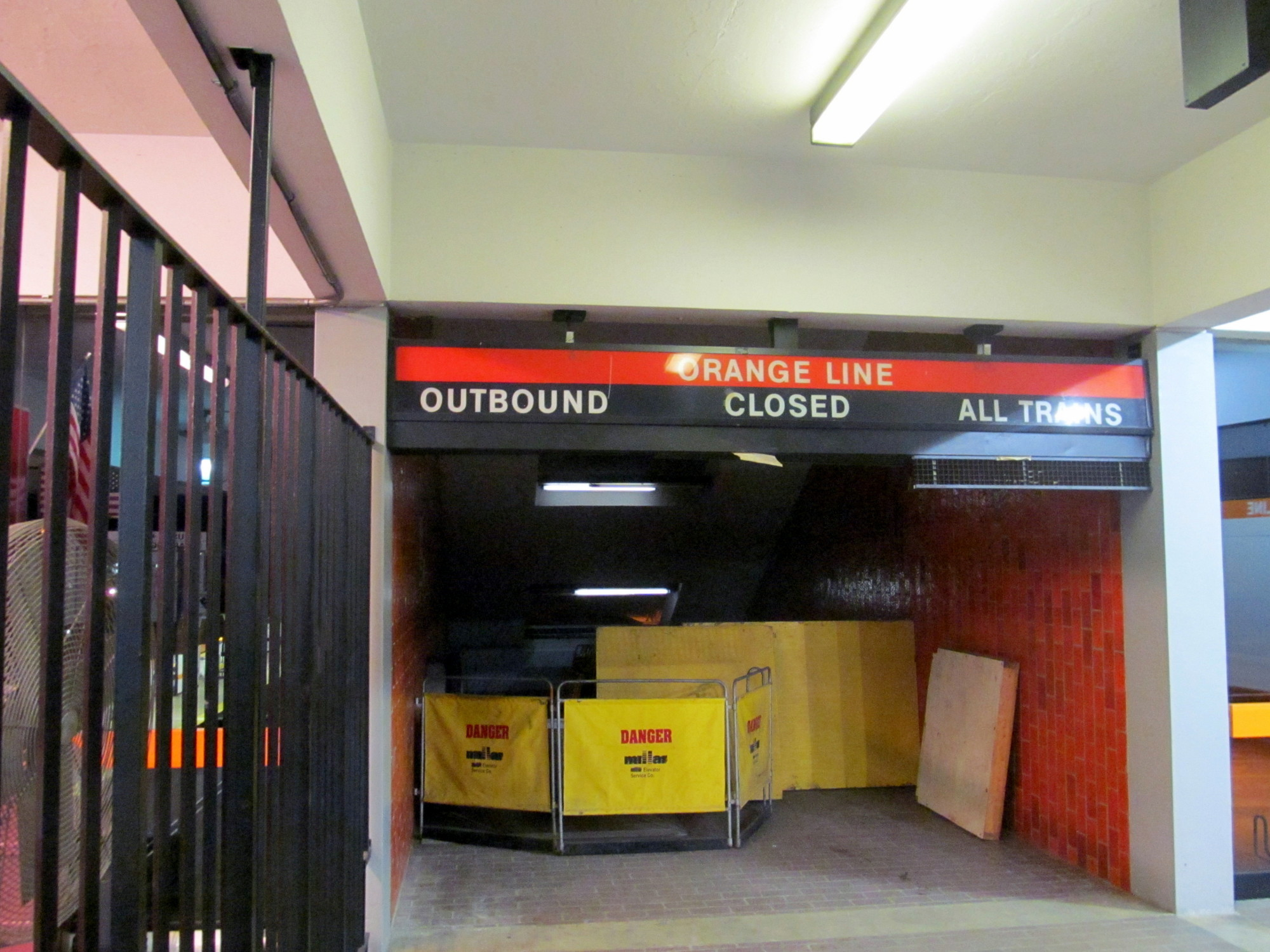
Entrance to the then-closed commuter rail platform from the fare mezzanine in 2013 The sign labeled it as the outbound Orange Line platform, as the inner Haverhill Line was intended to be turned into an extension of the Orange Line to Reading.

The Haymarket North Extension of the Orange Line was originally intended to run to Reading, but was cut back to Oak Grove. The MBTA awarded a $5.2 million contract for Oak Grove station in 1974, followed by a $1.3 million contract for grade separation of Winter Street in 1975. Total cost of the station was $8.5 million. Oak Grove station was completed in 1976, but its opening was delayed by the need to finish a land use study. The station ultimately opened on March 19, 1977, as the northern terminus of the extension. The design of Oak Grove station was based on that of North Quincy, which had opened in 1971.

Malden Center served as a stop for commuter rail trains from 1977 to 1979, while Oak Grove did not serve them. After the approach trestles at North Station burned on January 20, 1984, Malden Center temporarily became the inbound terminus for the Haverhill Line. The terminal was changed to Oak Grove on February 15, 1984. When North Station reopened on April 20, 1985, Malden Center replaced Oak Grove as the Malden commuter rail stop. The switch may have been made due to a request by John A. Brennan Jr., who was then constructing a large development near Malden Center station.

Because of its Orange Line connection, Oak Grove occasionally served as a temporary inbound terminus for Haverhill Line service during commuter rail service disruptions between Oak Grove and Boston's North Station. (Double track begins just north of the station, making operations easier than using Malden Center as the terminal.) It served this role during the 2004 Democratic National Convention, when North Station was closed for a week for security purposes.

In October 1997, Oak Grove was identified as a possible site for a parking garage, but this was never pursued. A footbridge over Spot Pond Brook connects the east side of the station to Fairlawn Street. On August 15, 2005, the MBTA began closing the bridge after 8 pm at the request of residents.

=== Renovations ===
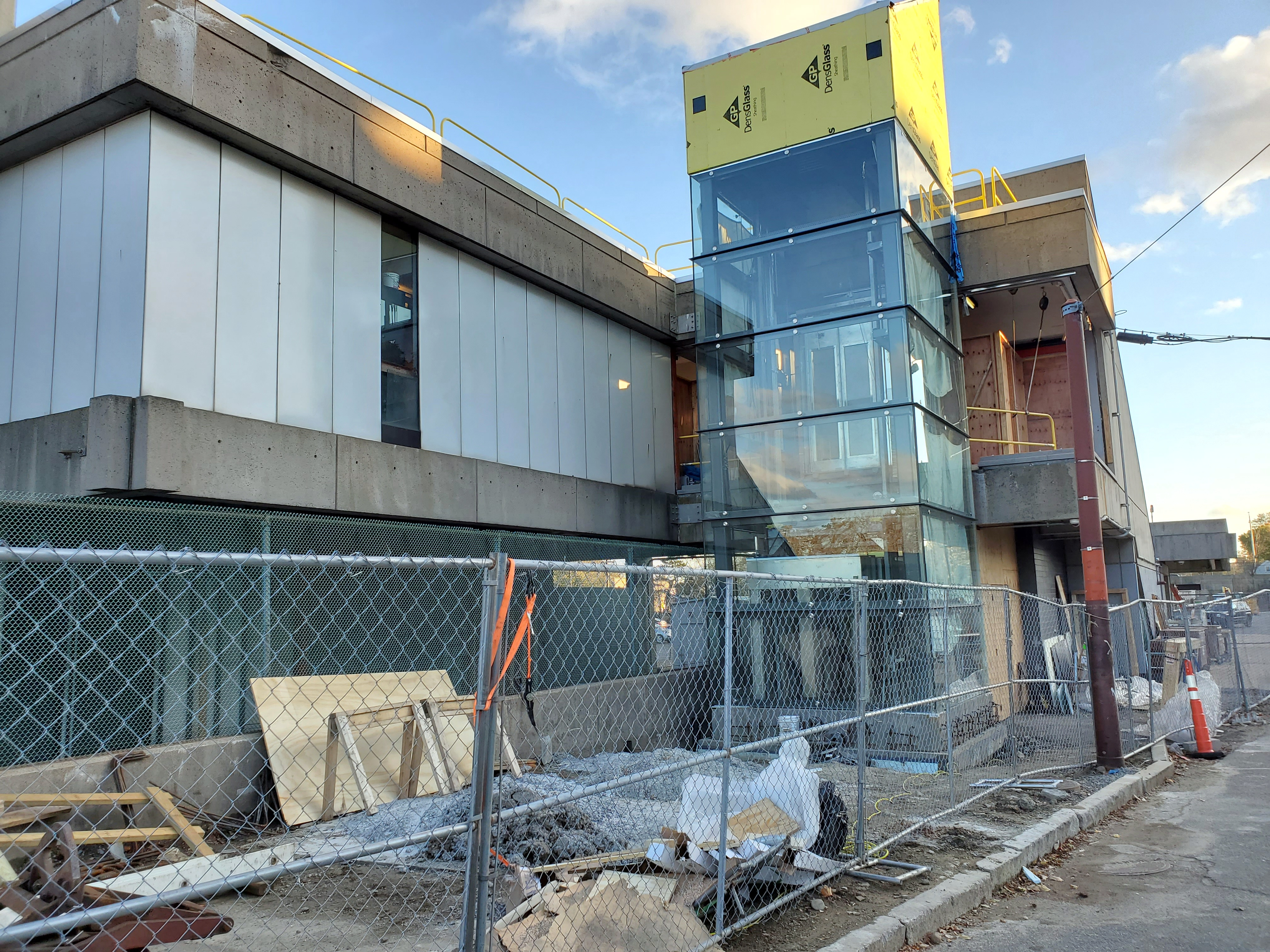
Washington Street elevator under construction in November 2020

During 2013, the MBTA performed heavy maintenance on the Orange Line platform, which had substantially deteriorated during 36 years of operation. High-pressure water was used to strip away the top layer of concrete; a smoother top coat and new tactile platform edging were installed. The work was performed on one side of the platform at a time with no station closures. The project also included new track lighting, guardrails, and expansion joints.

The project, originally expected to cost $2.3 million, was issued a notice to proceed in December 2012. Phase 1, which lasted from April to August 2013, focused on the inbound side of the platform. Original plans called for an exit-only ramp on the north end of the Orange Line platform to be constructed as part of Phase 1; however, this was put off due to the discovery of buried utilities not present on site plans. Phase 2, from August to December 2013, focused on the outbound side of the platform. From March 2 to June 30, 2014, the MBTA constructed the emergency exit ramp and a public restroom as Phase 3.

The existing elevators, which connect the fare mezzanine to the Orange Line platform and the busway, were built with the station and renovated in 1987. (This made Oak Grove the first Orange Line station to be accessible.) Three elevators were added to the station – an elevator between Washington Street and the mezzanine, a redundant elevator between the mezzanine and the platform, and a redundant elevator between the busway and the mezzanine – and one existing elevator renovated. The MBTA awarded a $22.5 million construction contract in August 2019, and work began that December. The Washington Street elevator opened on January 31, 2021, followed by the first new platform elevator in August. The new east elevator opened in May 2022, with the replacement platform elevator completed that November.

The entire Orange Line, including the Orange Line portion of Oak Grove station, was closed from August 19 to September 18, 2022, during maintenance work. The Haverhill Line stopped at Oak Grove during the closure to provide alternate service. Oak Grove was retained as a permanent Haverhill Line stop after the Orange Line closure. Rail service on the inner Haverhill Line was suspended from September 9 to November 5, 2023, to accommodate signal work. Substitute bus service was operated between Reading and Oak Grove.
