= PARC =

PARC or Parc may refer to:

== Biology ==
- PARC (gene), a eukaryotic gene/protein
- parC, a bacterial gene coding for subunit A of topoisomerase IV
- Pulmonary and activation-regulated chemokine, a former name for the protein CCL18

== Clubs ==
- Pays d'Aix Rugby Club, former name of the French rugby union club now known as Provence Rugby

== Entertainment ==
- Parc, an alias of the Swedish trance artist Jezper Söderlund
- Parc (film), a 2008 film

== Organizations ==
- PARC (company), the Palo Alto Research Center (formerly Xerox PARC)
- PARC Management, a theme park and entertainment venue operator
- Pakistan Agricultural Research Council
- Photography and the Archive Research Centre, an organisation within University of the Arts London
- Partners in Amphibian and Reptile Conservation, an organization initiated by the Savannah River Ecology Laboratory devoted to conservation of amphibians and reptiles
- Portland Anarchist Road Care, a road maintenance organization based in Portland, Oregon
- President's Appalachian Regional Commission, a predecessor of the Appalachian Regional Commission
- Pembrokeshire Against Radar Campaign, a predecessor of PARC Against DARC

== Places ==
- Parc, New York, a census-designated place named for the Plattsburgh Airbase Redevelopment Corporation
- Parc, Penrhyndeudraeth, a ruined mansion once owned by the Anwyl of Tywyn Family of Gwynedd, Wales
- Parc (HM Prison), a prison in South Wales
- Arctic Village Airport (ICAO: PARC), an airport in Arctic Village, Alaska

== Other ==
- Parco (disambiguation)

== See also ==
- Parc station (disambiguation)
- Le Parc (disambiguation)
