= Park station =

Park station may refer to:

- Park railway station, a former station in Manchester, England
- Johannesburg Park Station, the main railway station in Johannesburg, South Africa

Similarly named stations:

- Boggo Road railway station, formerly known as Park Road, a commuter rail station in Queensland, Australia
- Park Royal tube station, an Underground station in London, England
- Park West station, a Metromover station in Miami, Florida, United States

== See also ==
- Parc station (disambiguation)
- Park Avenue station (disambiguation)
- Park Lane station (disambiguation)
- Park Place station (disambiguation)
- Park Street station (disambiguation)
- Park and ride, parking lots with public transport connections
