= Pleasant Street station (BERy) =

Pleasant Street
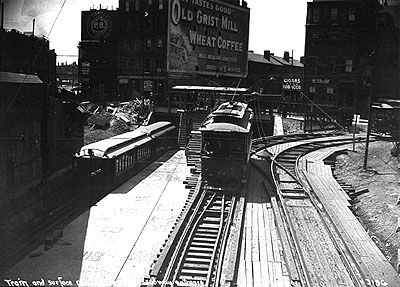
- Pleasant Street station in May 1901, a month before its opening; a Main Line El test train is visible at left.

General information
- Coordinates: 42°20′56.4″N 71°3′57.6″W
- Owner: Boston Elevated Railway
- Line: Tremont Street subway

History
- Opened: 10 June 1901
- Closed: 30 November 1908

Services
Preceding station	Boston Elevated Railway	Following station
Dover toward Dudley	Main Line Elevated 1901-1908	Boylston toward Sullivan Square
Location

Pleasant Street was a station of the Boston Elevated Railway (BERy) located just outside the Pleasant Street incline (the southern end of the Tremont Street subway) in downtown Boston, Massachusetts. Opening along with the rest of the Main Line Elevated (Main Line El) in June 1901, it served Main Line El trains from 1901 to 1908, temporarily replacing streetcar service through the Pleasant Street Incline (the streetcar lines formerly running into the Tremont Street subway through the incline were rerouted to the El's southern terminal at Dudley). In 1908, with the completion of the Washington Street Tunnel, the elevated trains were rerouted through the new tunnel, and Pleasant Street station was closed; although streetcar service to North Station through the Pleasant Street Incline promptly resumed (continuing until 1962), the streetcars did not stop at Pleasant Street.

== Station layout ==
P Platforms	Southbound	← Main Line Elevated toward Dudley (Dover)
P Platforms	Island platform, doors would open on the left
P Platforms	Northbound	Main Line Elevated toward Sullivan Square (Boylston) →
