= Park Street station (MBTA) =

Subway station in Boston, Massachusetts, US

Park Street
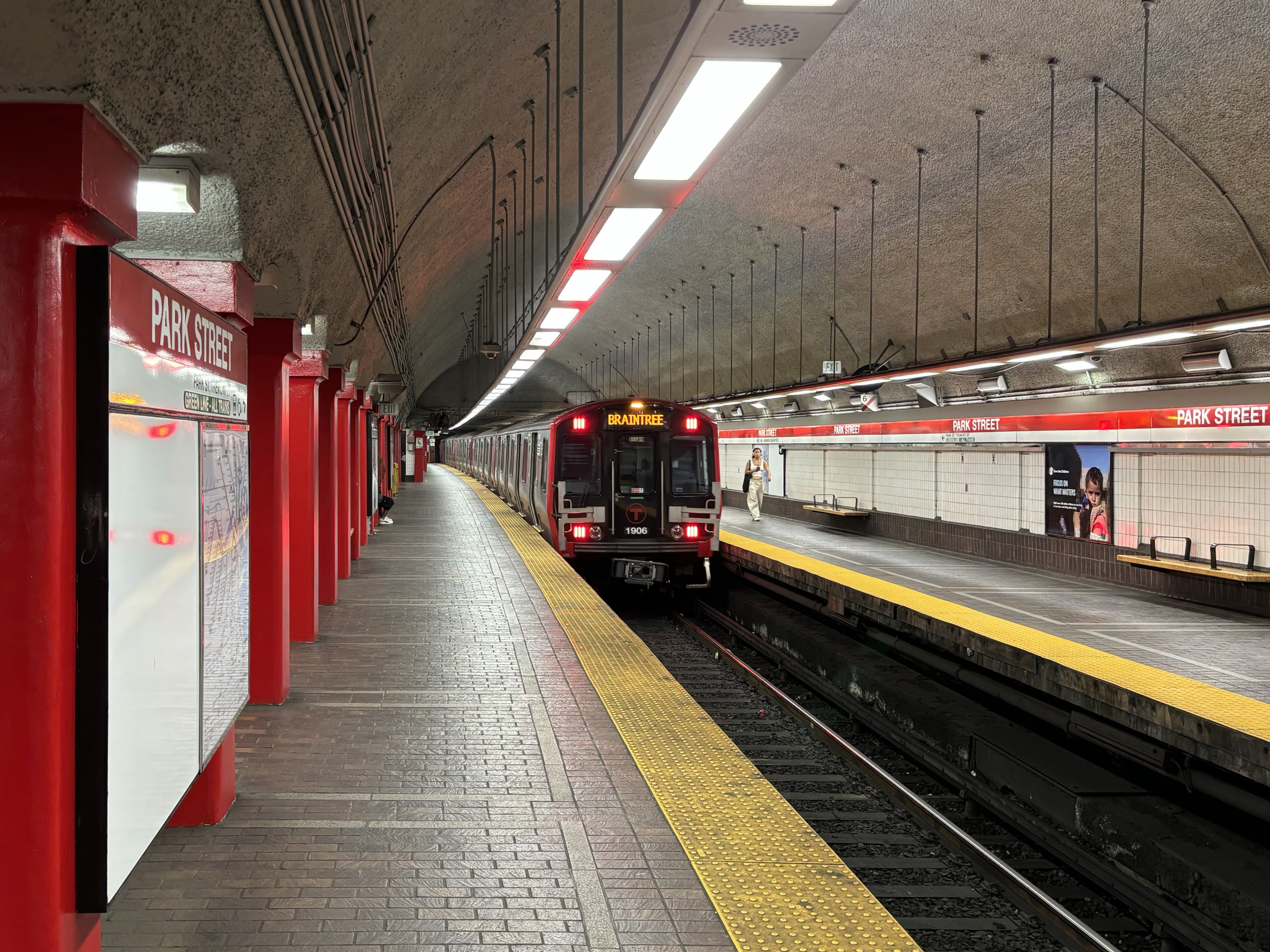
- A southbound Red Line train leaving the station in 2024

General information
- Location: Tremont Street and Park Street; Boston, Massachusetts
- Coordinates: 42.3563°N 71.0625°W
- Lines: Cambridge Tunnel; Tremont Street subway
- Platforms: 2 island platforms, 1 side platform (Green Line); 1 island platform, 2 side platforms (Red Line)
- Tracks: 4 (upper level - Green Line); 2 (lower level - Red Line)
- Connections: MBTA bus: 43; Orange Line and MBTA bus at Downtown Crossing (via Winter Street Concourse)

Construction
- Structure type: Underground
- Platform levels: 2
- Accessible: Yes

History
- Opened: September 1, 1897 (upper level); March 23, 1912 (lower level)
- Rebuilt: 1915, 1936, 1977–79, 1980s, 2004, 2012

Passengers
- FY2019: 16,571 (weekday average boardings)

Services
Preceding station	MBTA	Following station
Boylston toward Boston College	Green Line B branch	Government Center Terminus
Boylston toward Cleveland Circle	Green Line C branch	Government Center Terminus
Boylston toward Riverside	Green Line D branch	Government Center toward Union Square
Boylston toward Heath Street	Green Line E branch	Government Center toward Medford/Tufts
Charles/MGH toward Alewife	Red Line	Downtown Crossing toward Ashmont or Braintree
Boylston toward Nubian	Silver Line SL5	Terminus
Chinatown One-way operation	Silver Line SL5	Terminus
Former services
Preceding station	MBTA	Following station
Boylston toward Watertown	Green Line A branch Discontinued 1969	Terminus
Preceding station	Boston Elevated Railway	Following station
Boylston toward Dudley	Main Line Elevated 1901-1908	Scollay Square toward Sullivan Square
Track layout
Location

Park Street station is an MBTA subway station in Boston, Massachusetts. It is located at the intersection of Park Street and Tremont Street at the eastern edge of Boston Common in Downtown Boston. One of the two oldest stations on the "T" (the other is Boylston), and part of the oldest subway line in the United States, Park Street is the transfer point between the Green and Red lines, as one of the quartet of "hub stations" on the MBTA subway system. Park Street is the fifth-busiest station in the MBTA network, with an average of 16,571 entries each weekday in FY2019.

== History ==
=== Initial construction ===
==== Tremont Street subway ====
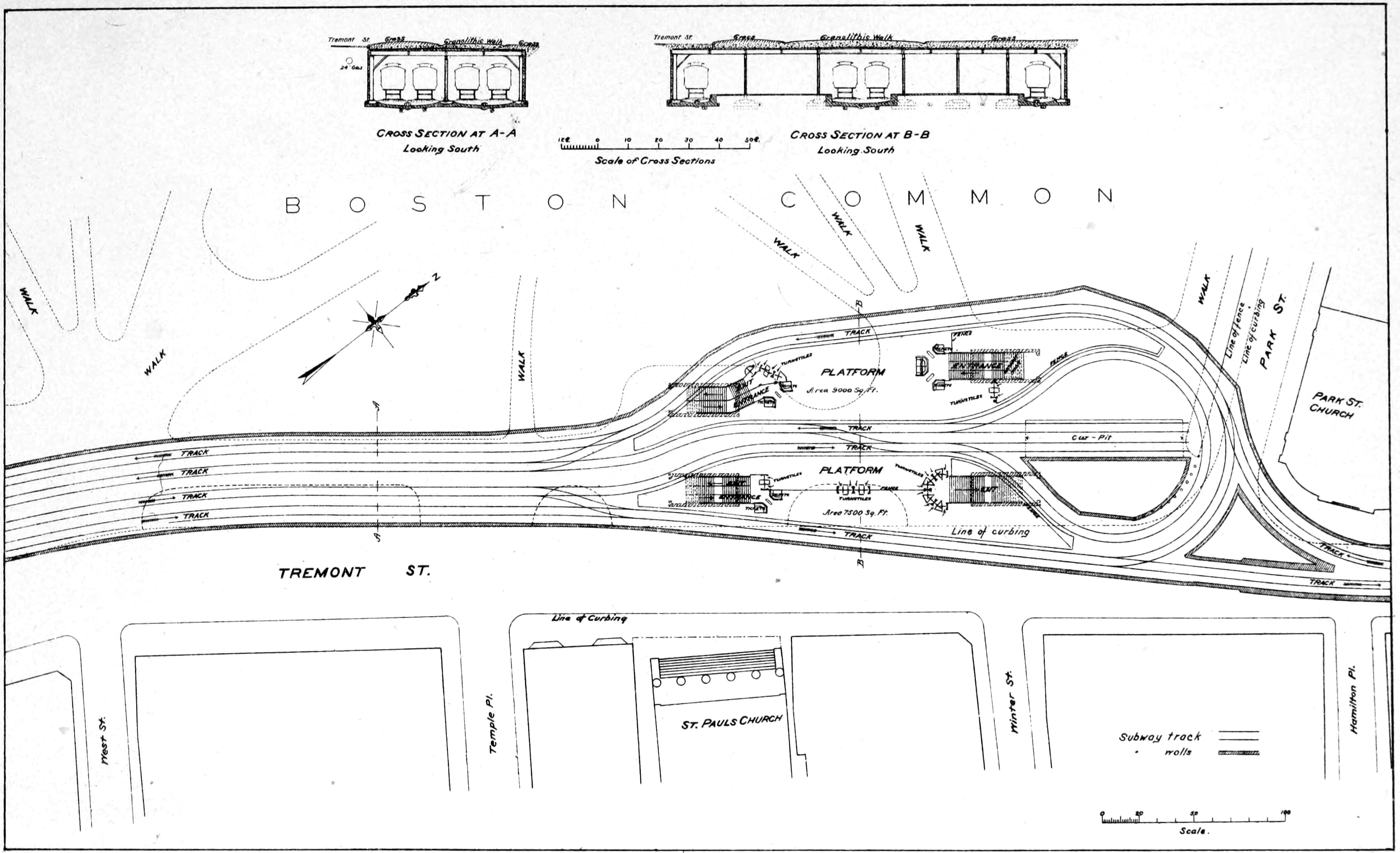
Plan of the Tremont Street subway (Green Line) level of Park Street in 1898; the station has since been substantially modified.

The southern section of the Tremont Street subway from the Public Garden incline through Boylston to Park Street opened on September 1, 1897, followed on October 1 by the spur to the Pleasant Street Portal. The station was built with 4 tracks serving 2 island platforms; these were connected by two loops, allowing streetcars from the south and west to reverse direction and return to the portals and surface routes.

On September 3, 1898, the tunnel was extended to Scollay Square, Adams Square, Haymarket Square, and the Canal Street Incline. Some cars ran all the way through the tunnel on the outer tracks; others continued to loop at Park Street.

Boylston and Park Street were built with rectangular stone headhouses designed by Edmund M. Wheelwright that did not aesthetically match the Common. Unlike the interior decor, the headhouses were sharply criticized as "resembling mausoleums" and "pretentiously monumental". Later stations on the East Boston Tunnel and Washington Street Tunnel used more modest headhouse designs in response to this criticism.

Electric destination indicator boards were first installed at Park Street in 1899, replacing an announcer with a megaphone. Signalmen used metal picks to complete a circuit, lighting up a numeral indicating which berth the car arriving on a given route would stop at.

==== Main Line Elevated ====
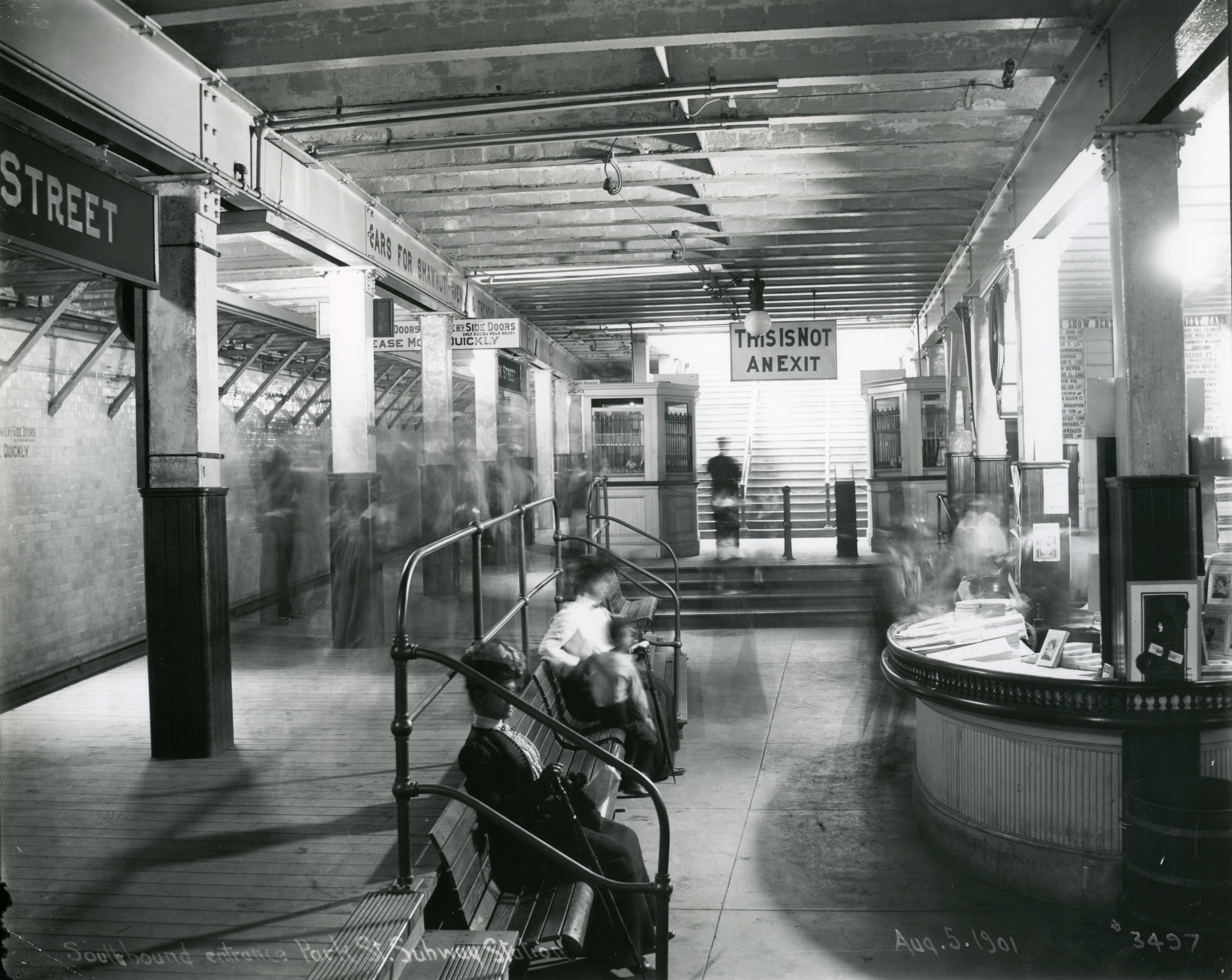
The southbound platform in August 1901, showing the wooden high-level platforms for Elevated trains

On June 10, 1901, the Main Line Elevated began running through the Tremont Street subway. The platforms at Park Street were retrofitted with raised wooden sections to allow elevated trains to run on the outer tracks to the Pleasant Street Portal, while streetcars continued to use the inner tracks and inner loop, entering the subway from the Public Garden incline. This arrangement lasted until Main Line service was moved to a separate tunnel under parallel Washington Street. Elevated trains last ran through the tunnel on November 28, 1908; they moved to the Washington Street Tunnel on November 30, and streetcar service returned to all tracks on December 4.

==== Cambridge subway ====
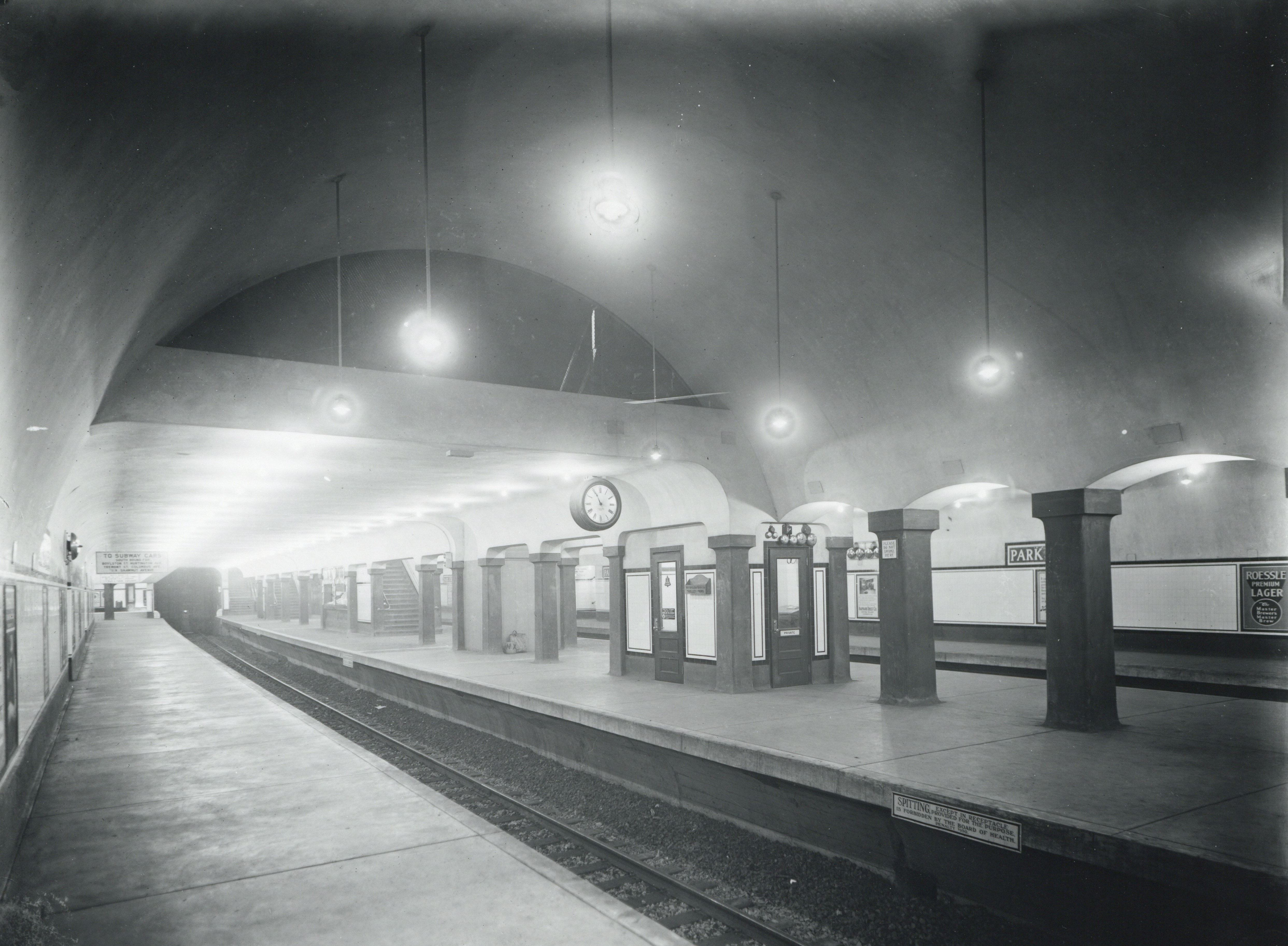
Cambridge subway platforms at Park Street Under in September 1912

On March 23, 1912, the Cambridge subway opened from Harvard Square to Park Street Under. Park Street Under was built with two tracks with one side platform each and a center island platform, intended as a Spanish solution setup to speed boarding. Stairwells were added to the original platform level to connect to the lower-level platforms. Unlike most other underground stations on the system (which were cut and cover construction with low ceilings), Park Street Under featured a spacious double-vaulted ceiling.

It was the first transfer station on the system to receive the "Under" postfix, rather than a separate name from the existing station. This represented a change in naming policy, and the first step towards easing wayfinding difficulties in the complex system. North Station West (opened later in 1912), South Station Under (1916) and Scollay Under (1916) would later use this naming scheme. Construction of the Dorchester Tunnel begun on May 3, 1912; this extension opened to Washington on April 4, 1915, and in three more segments to South Station Under in 1916, Broadway in 1917, and Andrew in 1918.

Overcrowding had been a problem at Park Street since the Main Line was routed through it, and did not improve when it reverted to streetcar-only operations. The problem worsened with the influx of passengers transferring at Park Street Under, as the only entrances to those platforms were narrow staircases connecting through the streetcar level. In preparation for the Boylston Street subway and the extension of the Cambridge subway, the Boston Transit Commission substantially expanded the streetcar level. The platforms were extended to the south and straightened; the southbound platform was increased in area by one-half, and the northbound platform by three-eighths. The south headhouse of the southbound platform was moved south to the end of the expanded platform. The construction work began on August 7, 1914, and was completed on March 8, 1915.

=== 1920s–1960s ===
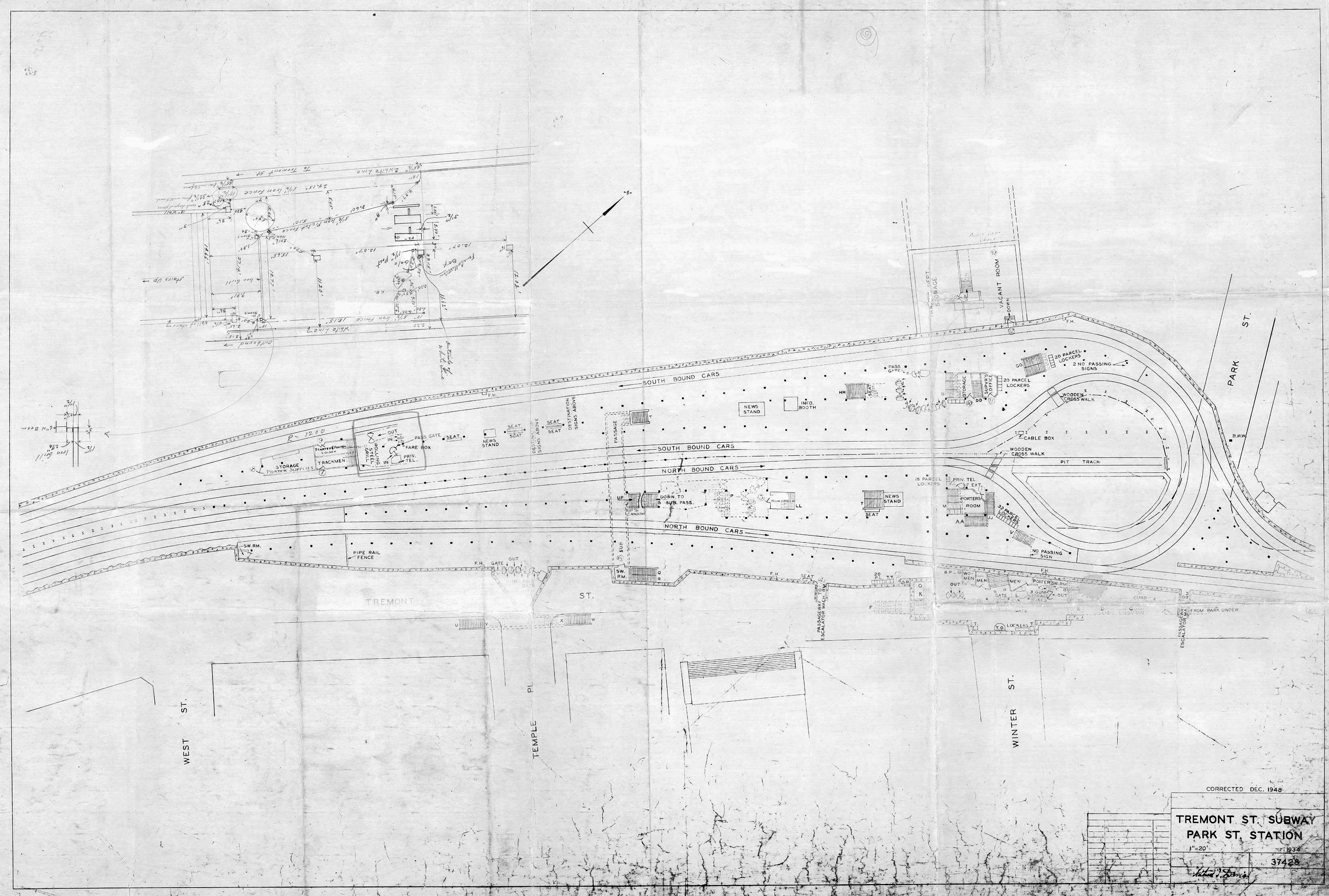
1934 plans of the streetcar level updated to 1948, showing the new northbound side platform and other modifications

A loudspeaker system for announcements was added in 1921. The Park Street Information Booth on the upper level, which soon became a Boston landmark, opened on December 15, 1923, and replaced an earlier kiosk in the same location. On January 3, 1925, an explosion of celluloid film carried by a passenger injured dozens on a streetcar arriving at the station.

Although the 1914–15 renovation increased the platform area, the narrow stairways to the lower level still impeded passenger flow. The stairway between the lower center platform and the upper northbound platform was replaced with a pair of stairways – one over the other – in a project that was completed in August 1921. Widening of the stairs between the southbound platforms was completed on August 22, 1922. The stairway between the upper southbound platform and the lower northbound platform was doubled in width, with the bottom half split into two sets in opposite directions. That work – partially necessitated by capacity increases in the East Boston Tunnel – was completed on December 24, 1924. Finally, widening of the stairs between the upper northbound platform and the lower southbound platform was completed on May 27, 1925. These improvements reduced the amount of room available on the north ends of the streetcar platforms, and boarding areas were moved south.

In July 1922, the Boston Transit Commission proposed the addition of a side platform adjacent to the outer northbound streetcar track, with a passageway under Tremont Street leading to two new entrances at Temple Place. Opening the Winter Street Concourse to passengers was also proposed, but was soon rejected by the Department of Public Utilities in favor of continued use as storage space for adjacent businesses. A more ambitious 1927 plan by one of the BERy trustees called for new side platforms on both sides of the streetcar level, with a sub-passage connecting the four streetcar platforms, as well as the Temple Place entrances and Winter Street passageway. In 1933, the two stairway headhouses on the east side of Tremont Street were replaced with low walls, as had previously been done at Scollay Square and Adams Square.

In 1936, in response to still-persistent overcrowding, the Boston Transit Department constructed a new northbound side platform under Tremont Street with entrances at Temple Street. The project also added a sub-passage connecting the streetcar platforms and a passage connecting the new platform with the Cambridge Tunnel fare lobby opposite Park Street, but did not open the Winter Street Concourse. The new platform moved the northbound streetcar boarding area further south for the second time. A new lighting system was also installed. The project, funded by the Works Progress Administration, cost $407,000 (equivalent to $7.41 million in 2025). Work began on January 8, 1936, and the new platform was opened on December 5.

The 1947 state act that created the Metropolitan Transit Authority (MTA) from the Boston Elevated Railway established four immediate projects for the new agency, one of which was expansion of the Tremont Street subway to four tracks between Park Street and Scollay Square. As part of the plan, Park Street and Boylston stations were to be combined into a single Boston Common station, with a direct entrance from an underground parking garage. The garage ultimately opened in 1961, but the stations were not combined. The south headhouse on the northbound side was removed in 1963.

=== MBTA era ===
In 1964, the outer loop track was removed. Instead, a new crossover switch was installed to allow southbound streetcars from the through track to reach either side of the southbound platform. There have been proposals to reconnect the outer loop, to allow trains on the outer inbound track to be turned around at Park Street, but this has not been done because of the cost of structural reinforcements that would now be required. A short stub "pit" track for emergency service remains within the inner loop. In 1966, the south headhouse on the southbound platform was converted to an information booth for the new Freedom Trail, with only an exit provided from the station.

In 1967, as part of a general system rebranding by the newly formed MBTA, the subway lines were assigned colors. The streetcar system—then down to five branches, and soon four—became the Green Line, the Cambridge–Dorchester line became the Red Line, and the Main Line El became the Orange Line. In the 1970s, the MBTA began allowing street musicians to play in the station. Park Street was used as a filming location for See How She Runs (1978) and Spenser: For Hire (1985–88); the sitcom Park Street Under (1979) was set in a fictional bar inside the station.

==== 1970s modernization ====
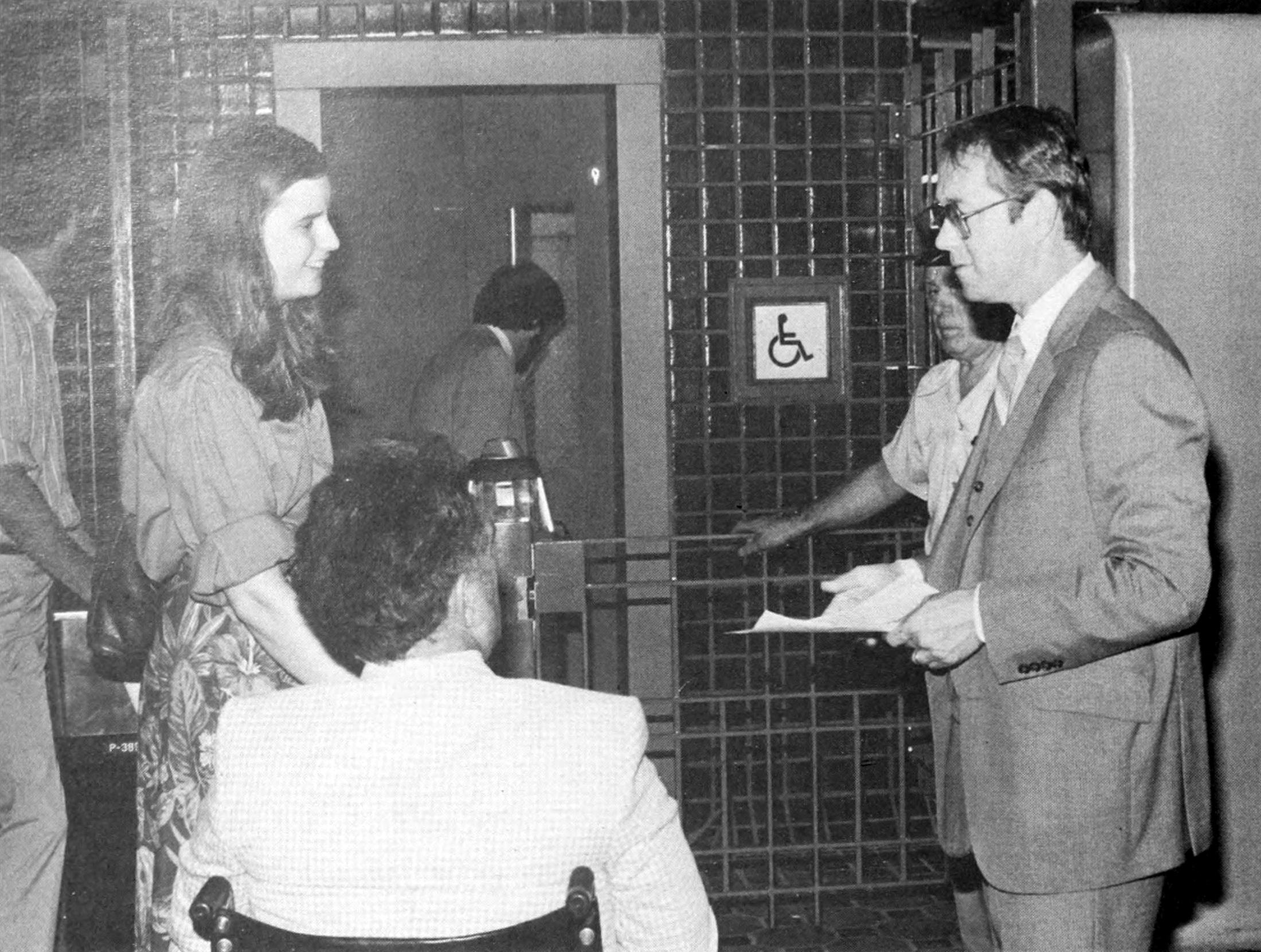
A newly opened elevator in 1979

The 1970s saw the first major renovations to the station in four decades. In 1972, the agency received a federal grant that funded two-thirds of a $14.3 million modernization program for downtown stations, included $4.2 million for Park Street. As part of that project, the MBTA investigated the feasibility of connecting Essex, Park Street, Washington, and State with pedestrian tunnels. Plans were released for the modernization of Park Street and three other downtown stations on August 27, 1975.

A $3.6 million contract was awarded on December 1, 1976. The 1936-built Temple Place entrance and passageway were closed that month, and concession stands were removed in 1977. The modernization included new wall tiles, new lighting, rebuilt staircases, and upgrades to the faregate area on the southbound platform. The work included the replacement of the remaining original copper headhouses with three modern glass-and-steel structures. Elevators to the fare lobby from the Red Line center platform and the surface were installed in 1979, making the Red Line section accessible. However, the surface elevator was frequently out of service due to repairs and other construction in the station. The aesthetics of the renovation were not well received; one longtime employee remarked the station resembled a billiard parlor.

The Winter Street Concourse, an upper level of the Dorchester Tunnel between Park Street and Downtown Crossing, was cleared of some non-public storage and office space, and opened as a pedestrian connector in January 1979. It allows passengers to walk from the northbound Green Line side platform at Park Street to the southbound Orange Line platform at Downtown Crossing while remaining inside fare control.

==== Later changes ====
From August 1981 to June 22, 1996, additional peak-hour Red Line trains ran between Quincy Center station and Park Street, using crossovers north of Park Street to reverse direction. Between November 30, 1981, and June 1982, Park Street was also the northern terminus of a small number of five-car trains (the first Red Line trains longer than four cars), as station platforms to the north were not yet extended for longer trains.

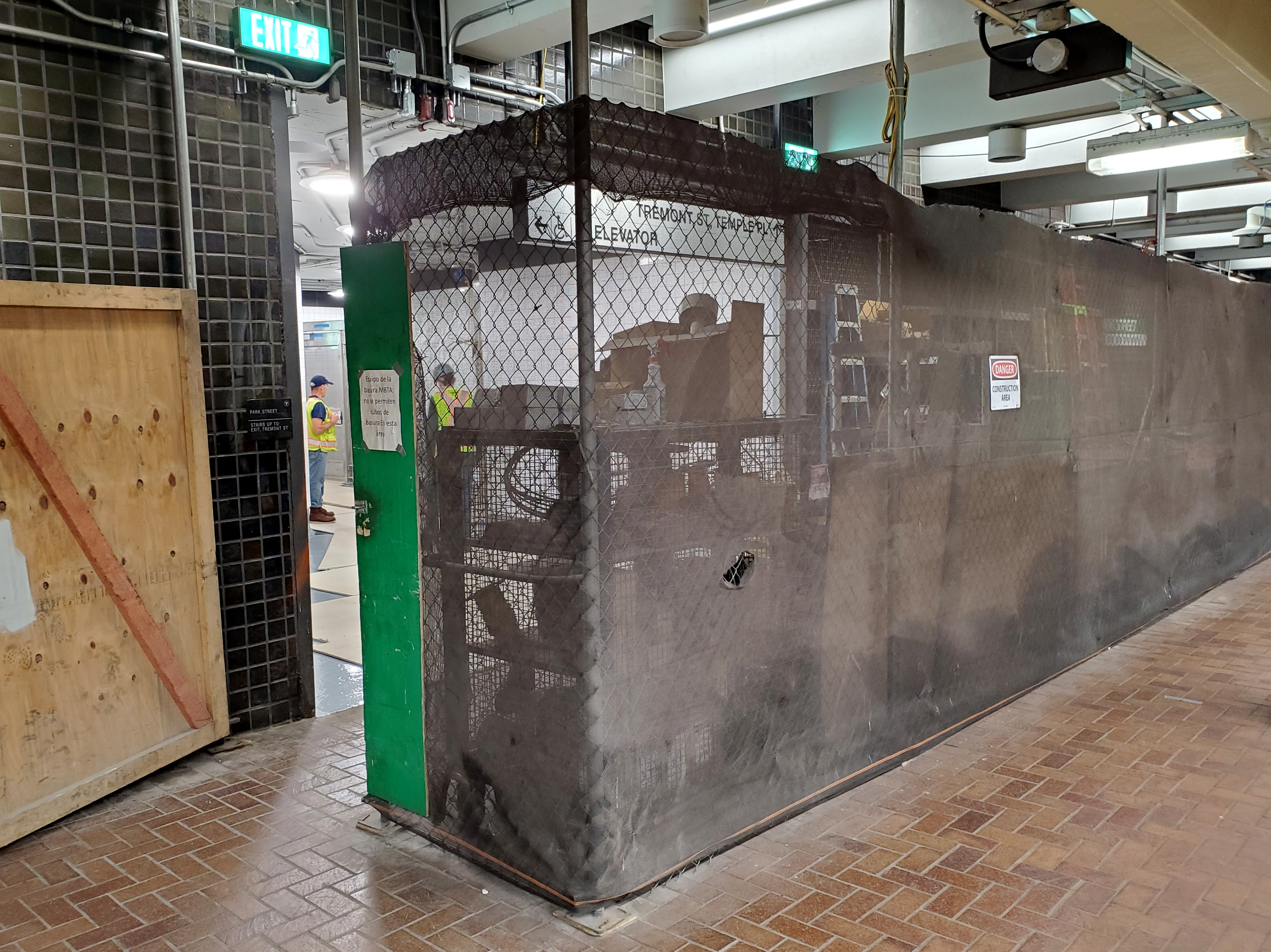
Construction work in the 1976-closed Temple Place exit in July 2021

In the mid-1980s, the MBTA spent $80 million to extend the platforms of seven Red Line and three Orange Line stations to allow the use of six-car trains. The agency obtained a $22 million federal grant in 1984 to partially fund the Central, Park Street, and Washington station work. In 1985–86, the platforms at Park Street were extended to the north. Six-car trains began operation on January 21, 1988. Temporary artworks were placed in the station during the renovation as part of the Arts on the Line program. One work by Christopher Janney featured a synthesizer controlled by photoelectric sensors, placed so that passing passengers would interrupt the beams and change the sounds.

The MBTA opened bidding for an additional round of construction in March 1991; a $6 million contract was issued on July 10. The 1993-completed project included elevators to the Green Line sub-passage, completing elevator access to all platforms; however, Green Line trains were not yet accessible. The northbound Green Line headhouse was exit-only until June 20, 1992, when it was converted to also serve as an entrance. Around that time, a new south headhouse was built on the southbound side as the Freedom Trail information center was moved to a new structure nearby; it was exit-only until automated fare collection equipment was installed around 2007.

Around 2000, the MBTA outfitted the Green Line platforms with portable lifts as a temporary accessibility measure to serve the new low-floor Type 8 streetcars. A $15 million project to build raised low platforms at Park Street and Haymarket began in 2001. The work at Park Street was done in segments to allow service to the station to continue during construction. Construction was completed in 2003.

New elevators from the surface to the westbound Green Line unpaid lobby and from the westbound Green Line platform to the Red Line island platform opened on December 21, 2012. They were built, and two other elevators rebuilt, as part of the 2006 settlement of Joanne Daniels-Finegold, et al. v. MBTA. In early 2019, the MBTA accepted bids for a $11.8 million renovation of Park Street station. The project includes replacement of all wayfinding signage and lighting, as well as the reopening of the 1976-closed Temple Place exit. Work began in April 2019 and was largely completed in December 2020 except for the exit. The elevator between the Red Line lobby and platform will be replaced as part of accessibility improvements at Downtown Crossing. Bidding for a construction manager at risk for an estimated $95 million contract, including the Downtown Crossing and Park Street elevators plus similar work at Central, opened in April 2025. Construction was expected to last from April 2026 to January 2031. Notice to proceed was given in September 2025. As of October 2026, the Park Street elevator work is expected to begin in late 2028 after the completion of one of the Downtown Crossing elevators.

== Station layout ==
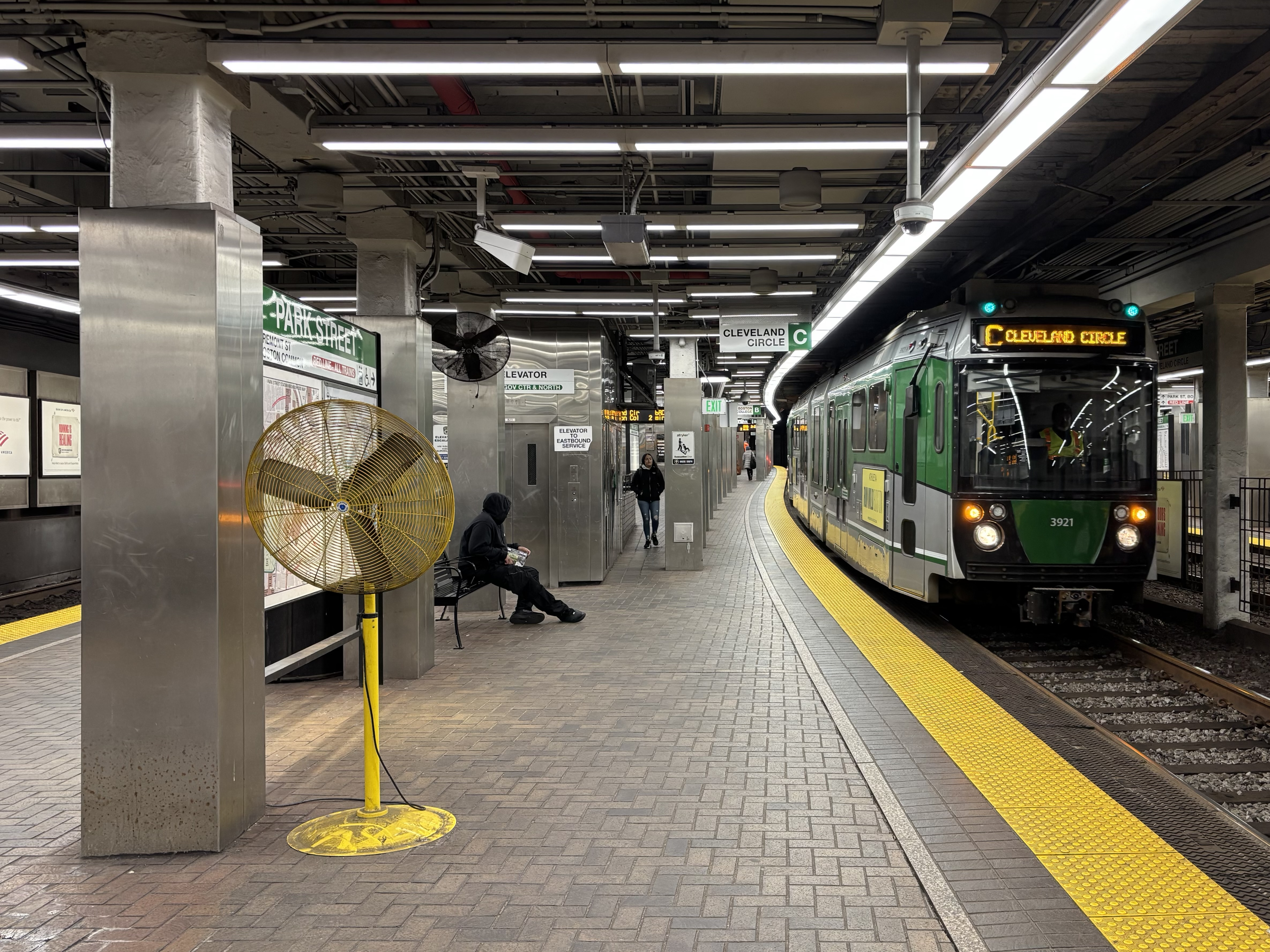
A westbound Green Line train at Park Street station in April 2025

Park Street is a bi-level station, with the Green Line running on the upper level and the Red Line on the lower level. The Green Line has four tracks numbered 1 to 4 (north to south). Tracks 1 and 2 serve an island platform for westbound trains. Tracks 3 and 4 serve an island platform for eastbound trains, with an additional side platform serving Track 4. Track 4 is used by all eastbound through trains; Track 3 is only used by trains terminating at Park Street, as it loops to rejoin Track 2. Both island platforms have headhouses and fare control areas on their northeast end; the westbound platform also has a headhouse at its southwest end. A sub-passage connects the middle of the three Green Line platforms. A passage from the eastbound side platform leads to a small fare lobby under Winter Street, with stairs to the surface and the Winter Street Concourse to Downtown Crossing.

The Red Line has two tracks: Track 5 southbound and Track 6 northbound. The Red Line has both island and side platforms; however, unlike the Spanish solution, all platforms are used for both boarding and alighting. Staircases connect each platform to both Green Line island platform and the fare lobby; exit-only escalators lead from the southern end of the side platforms to the surface. A backup control room for the subway system is located on the Green Line level over the middle of the Red Line platforms.

Park Street station is not a major bus transfer point, though MBTA bus route 43 stops on Tremont Street at Temple Place. Silver Line route SL5 stops on Temple Place, midway between Park Street and Downtown Crossing; MBTA maps show the connection at Downtown Crossing.

=== Accessibility ===
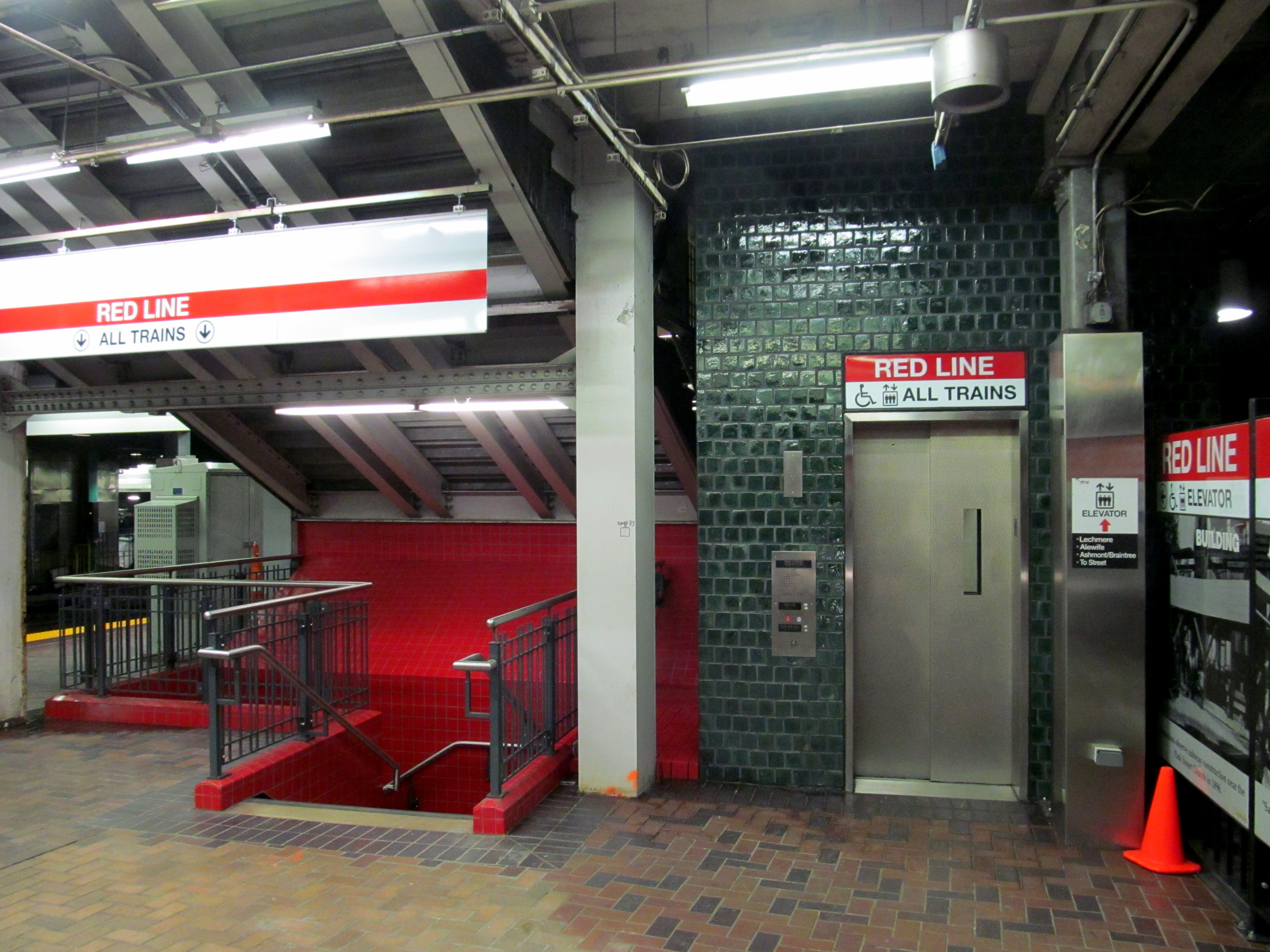
The Red Line elevator from the westbound Green Line platform

Park Street station is accessible for passengers on all trains. Elevators connect the surface to the westbound Green Line platform, and to the fare lobby. The Red Line center platform has elevators to the westbound Green Line platform and to the fare lobby; the Red Line side platforms are not accessible. Elevators also connect the westbound Green Line platform and the eastbound side platform to the sub-passage. Because there are no elevators connecting the Red Line with the southbound Orange Line at Downtown Crossing, the accessible route for that transfer uses the Winter Street Concourse and the elevator at Park Street.

=== Public art ===
There are several pieces of public art in the station. Celebration of the Underground by Lilli Ann K. Rosenberg is a large wall mosaic along the outer outbound (westbound) tracks at the Green Line level, and can be viewed from the outbound island platform. The mosaic commemorates the designation of the Tremont Street subway, including Park Street station, as a National Historic Landmark. Created in 1978, it received renewed attention in 2020 after it was cleaned and better lit.

Benedictions by Ralph Helmick consists of two giant bronze hands each mounted separately over the inbound and outbound Red Line tracks on the lower level of the station. Each hand is posed in a classic gesture of benediction or blessing.
