= Boylston station =

Subway station in Boston, Massachusetts, US

Boylston
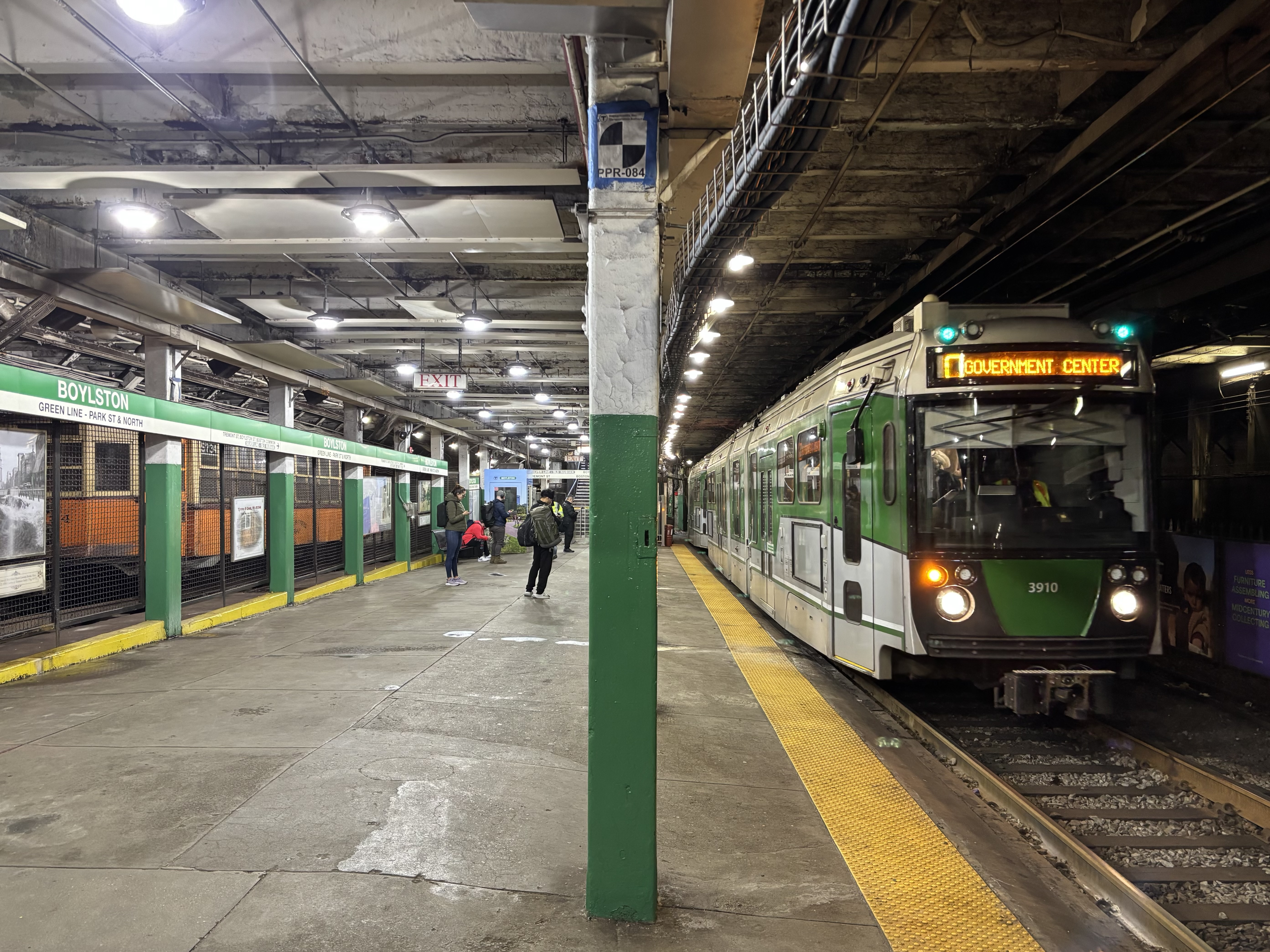
- An inbound train entering Boylston station in February 2025

General information
- Location: Boylston Street at Tremont Street; Boston, Massachusetts
- Coordinates: 42.3530°N 71.0646°W
- Line: Tremont Street subway
- Platforms: 2 island platforms (used as side platforms)
- Tracks: 4 (2 in service)
- Connections: MBTA bus: 43

Construction
- Structure type: Underground
- Accessible: Green Line platforms are not accessible

History
- Opened: September 1, 1897 (Green Line); July 30, 2002 (Silver Line)

Passengers
- FY2019: 5,265 boardings (weekday average)

Services
Preceding station	MBTA	Following station
Arlington toward Boston College	Green Line B branch	Park Street toward Government Center
Arlington toward Cleveland Circle	Green Line C branch	Park Street toward Government Center
Arlington toward Riverside	Green Line D branch	Park Street toward Union Square
Arlington toward Heath Street	Green Line E branch	Park Street toward Medford/Tufts
Tufts Medical Center toward Nubian	Silver Line SL5	Downtown Crossing One-way operation
Former services
Preceding station	Boston Elevated Railway	Following station
Pleasant Street toward Dudley	Main Line Elevated 1901-1908	Park Street toward Sullivan Square
Preceding station	MBTA	Following station
Arlington toward Watertown	Green Line A branch	Park Street Terminus
Track layout
Location

Boylston station (also signed as Boylston Street) is a light rail station on the MBTA Green Line in downtown Boston, Massachusetts, located on the southeast corner of Boston Common at the intersection of Boylston Street and Tremont Street. A southbound street-level stop for the SL5 route of the bus rapid transit Silver Line is outside fare control. The station has two island platforms; each has one disused track, making them effectively side platforms. Boylston is not accessible for Green Line trains.

Boylston station was opened in 1897 as part of the original segment of the Tremont Street subway. Originally used by streetcars, from 1901 to 1908 it also served Main Line Elevated trains. Unlike other Green Line stations, Boylston has been little modified, and retains much of its original appearance. Two of the original four headhouses have been removed, however, and a sub-passage connecting the platforms has been sealed. Construction of a proposed underground Silver Line station was proposed in the 1990s; that phase of the project was cancelled in 2010.

== Station layout ==
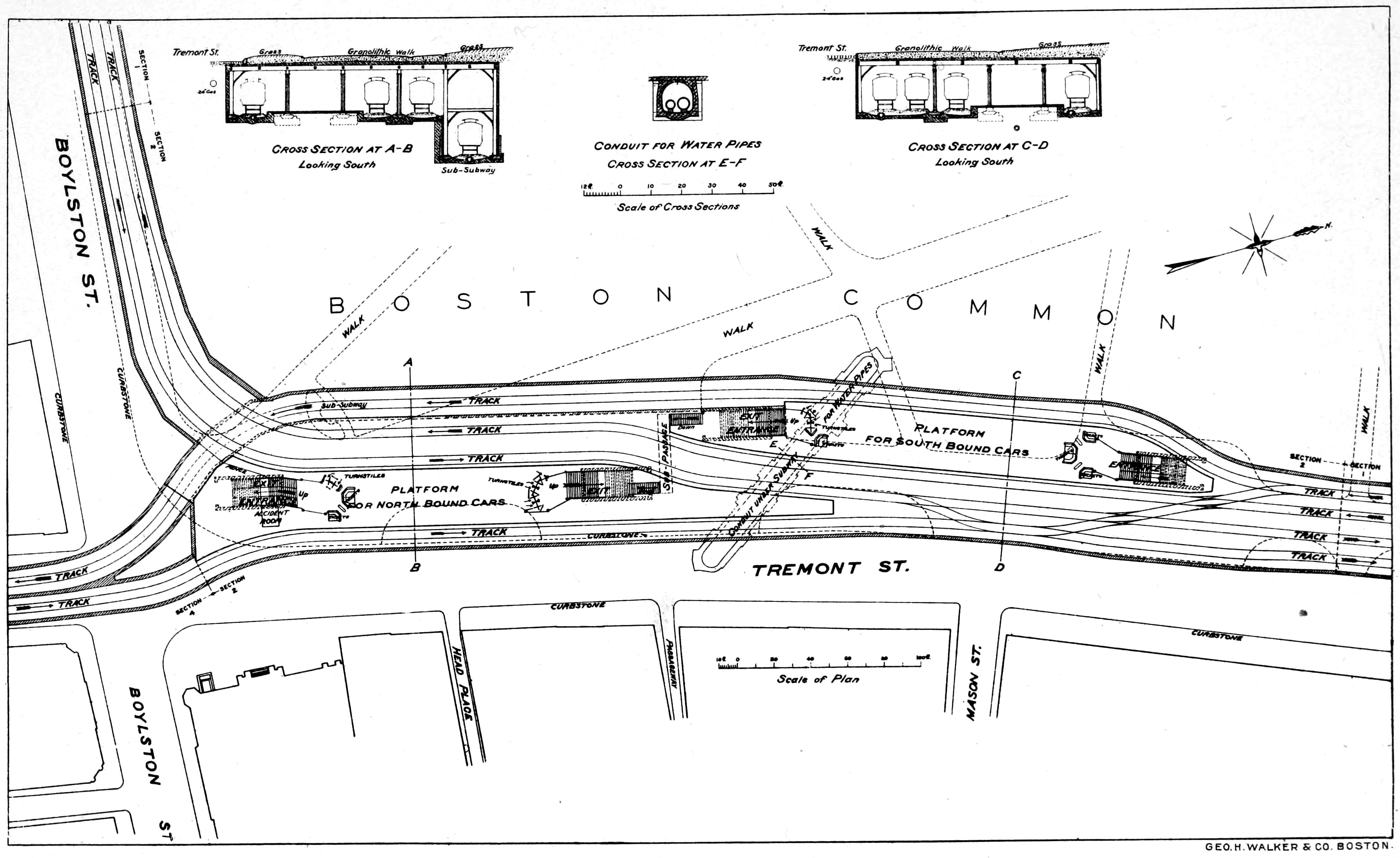
1898 plan of Boylston station

Boylston was originally configured for four tracks with two island platforms, and the original track layout has remained essentially unchanged since then. The two outer tracks formerly led to the Pleasant Street incline. A stub of the former outer southbound track is used for work car storage. The northbound track has been fully removed; a disconnected segment of track holds two former streetcars for display. The cars (PCC #3295 and Type 5 #5734) were used for fan trips until 1990 and 1998.

The Green Line takes a sharp right-angle turn just south of Boylston station, as it turns from Tremont Street onto Boylston Street. The tight radius of curvature of the track frequently causes loud squealing noises to emit from the train wheels, which are audible at street level near the station entrance at the corner. In 2017, the Green Line added 6 greasing units to the existing 13 in the system; these devices pump grease onto train wheels and the rail as trains pass them. The MBTA also retrofitted flange stick lubricators on newer trains, which scrape graphite onto the side of the wheel and do not affect braking. However, in 2018, journalism students from adjacent Emerson College measured sound intensities over 110 dBA in the station.

== History ==
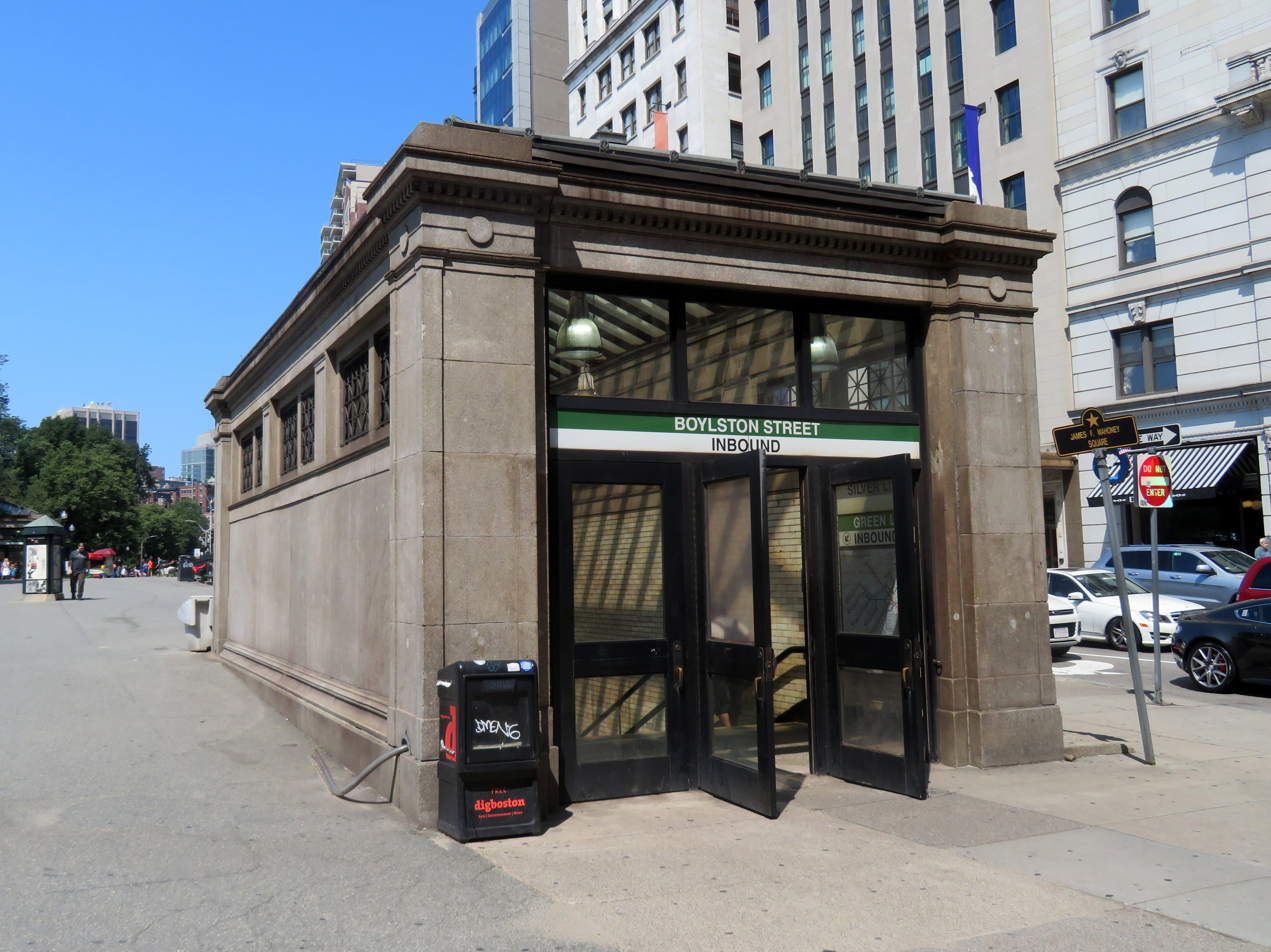
One of the two original headhouses that remain

Boylston and Park Street were the first two stations built in the Tremont Street subway. The General Court ordered the construction of the subway and station, which were constructed between 1895 and 1897. The construction of the subway broke ground on the site of the current Boylston station. When the station opened in 1897, it became the first underground rapid transit station in the United States.

Boylston and Park Street were built with rectangular stone headhouses designed by Edmund M. Wheelwright that did not aesthetically match the Common. Unlike the interior decor, the headhouses were sharply criticized as "resembling mausoleums" and "pretentiously monumental". Later stations on the East Boston Tunnel and Washington Street Tunnel incorporated this criticism into their more modest headhouses.

As opened, the inner tracks at Boylston ran between the Public Garden incline to the west and the inner loop at Park Street, while the outer tracks ran between the Pleasant Street incline to the south and the outer through tracks at Park Street. Most streetcars from the west looped at Park Street, while those from the south continued through to North Station. From 1901 to 1908, Main Line Elevated trains ran on the outer tracks (with temporary high-level wood platforms) while streetcars continued to use the inner tracks.

The Boylston Street incline (replacing the Public Garden incline) and Boylston Street subway opened on October 3, 1914, both using the inner tracks. On October 10, the fence dividing the northbound platform was opened, allowing passengers from the west to transfer to northbound streetcars from the south. On October 9, 1915, the fence was again closed, forcing passengers from the west to transfer at Park Street (after cars from the south had dropped off many passengers) rather than at Boylston Street.

In 1947, the General Court created the Metropolitan Transit Authority (MTA) from the Boston Elevated Railway and established four immediate projects for the new agency, one of which was expansion of the Tremont Street Subway to four tracks between Park Street and Scollay Square. As part of the plan, Park Street and Boylston stations were to be combined into a single Boston Common station, with a direct entrance from an underground parking garage. The garage ultimately opened in 1961, but the stations were not combined.

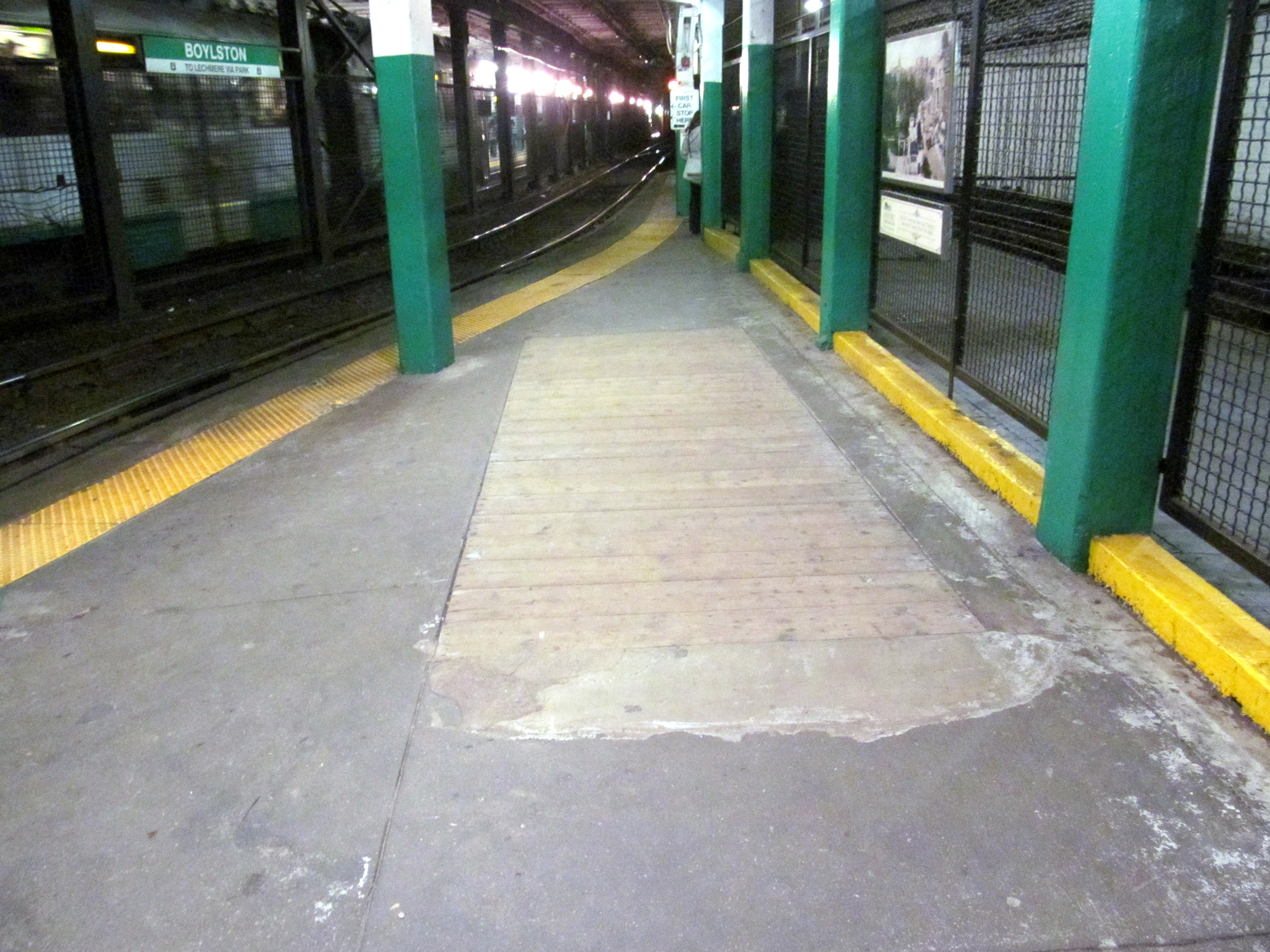
The former entrance to the sub-passage, which was closed around 1968

The exit-only north headhouse on the southbound platform was removed in 1958, followed by its northbound twin around 1962. On November 19, 1961, the Lenox Street line was substituted with buses. A shuttle service was run between Boylston and Pleasant Street until April 6, 1962, at which time the outer tracks at Boylston were closed. In 1964, the Tremont Street subway, including Boylston station, was designated a National Historic Landmark. Of the two original stations, Boylston retained more of its original appearance, having undergone only minimal changes in over a century of continuous operation. The sub-passage between the platforms was closed around 1968, and permanently sealed off in 1981. In 1974, local students installed nine colorful panels in the station as part of the MBTA's arts program.

The northbound outer track was removed in 1983. A planned renovation in 1986 was deferred due to the station's historic status, though the disused outer tracks were fenced off. The MBTA again planned a renovation of the station – including elevators for accessibility – in 1990, but did not construct the project. In mid-2006, the MBTA installed brighter lighting at Boylston station, as well as modern electronic faregates and fare vending machines for the CharlieCard system.

Plans for the South Boston Piers Transitway (later part of the Silver Line) were approved in 1993, calling for a bus rapid transit level at Boylston under the Green Line level. This portion was deferred in 1999, to become Phase III of the project. Silver Line service on the surface, running on Tremont Street, began stopping at Boylston in December 2001. After substantial increases in projected cost, Phase III was cancelled in 2010.

In 2019, the MBTA indicated that Boylston was a "Tier II" accessibility priority pending the results of conceptual design. As of 2025, the MBTA expects Boylston and Hynes Convention Center to be the only Green Line stations not made accessible by 2030.

=== Incidents and accidents ===
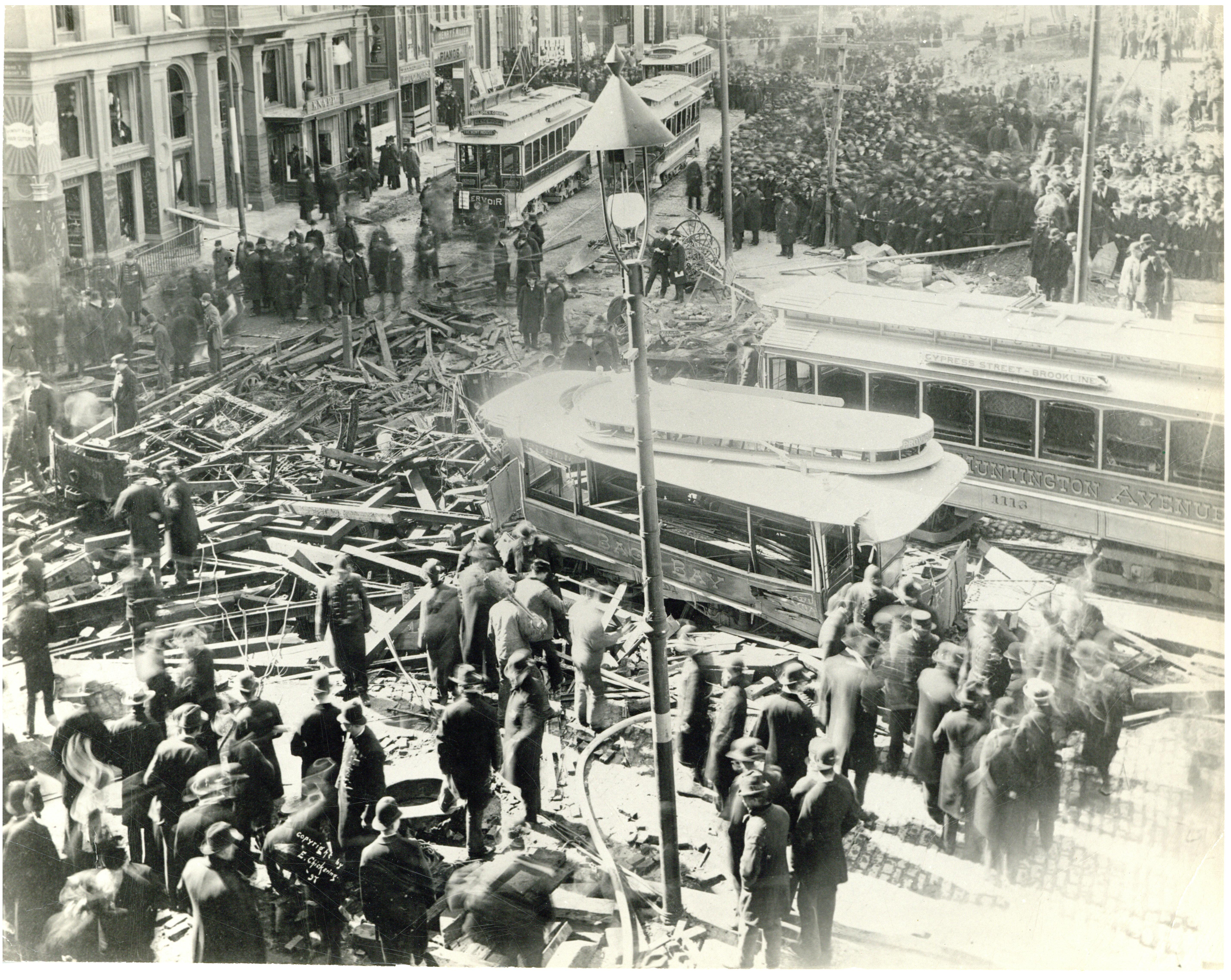
Aftermath of the March 1897 explosion at the corner of Boylston and Tremont Streets

A few months before the station opened, there was a gas explosion at the corner of Tremont and Boylston Streets on March 4, 1897. Illuminating gas had been escaping from an underground main for two months into the cavity between the station's roof and the street above, before a horse-drawn trolley caused a spark which ignited the gas. Witnesses reported that a fireball engulfed the trolley, and burned several people and horses instantaneously. Six people were killed, and at least sixty were seriously injured. The station was spared any serious damage, as much of the force of the blast had radiated upward.

On June 6, 1906, there was another explosion at Boylston station. The origin of the explosion was deemed to be the short-circuiting of the overhead lines in the station, which began to burn and catch fire. Because of the electrical nature of the fire, spraying water to stop the flames failed, and fire-fighters who attempted to do so were met with electric shocks. Only three people were injured, and the fire extinguished itself.

On August 4, 1958, a fire in the fuse box of a streetcar at Boylston injured 23 people.
