= Route 43 (MBTA) =

Boston, Massachusetts bus route

43
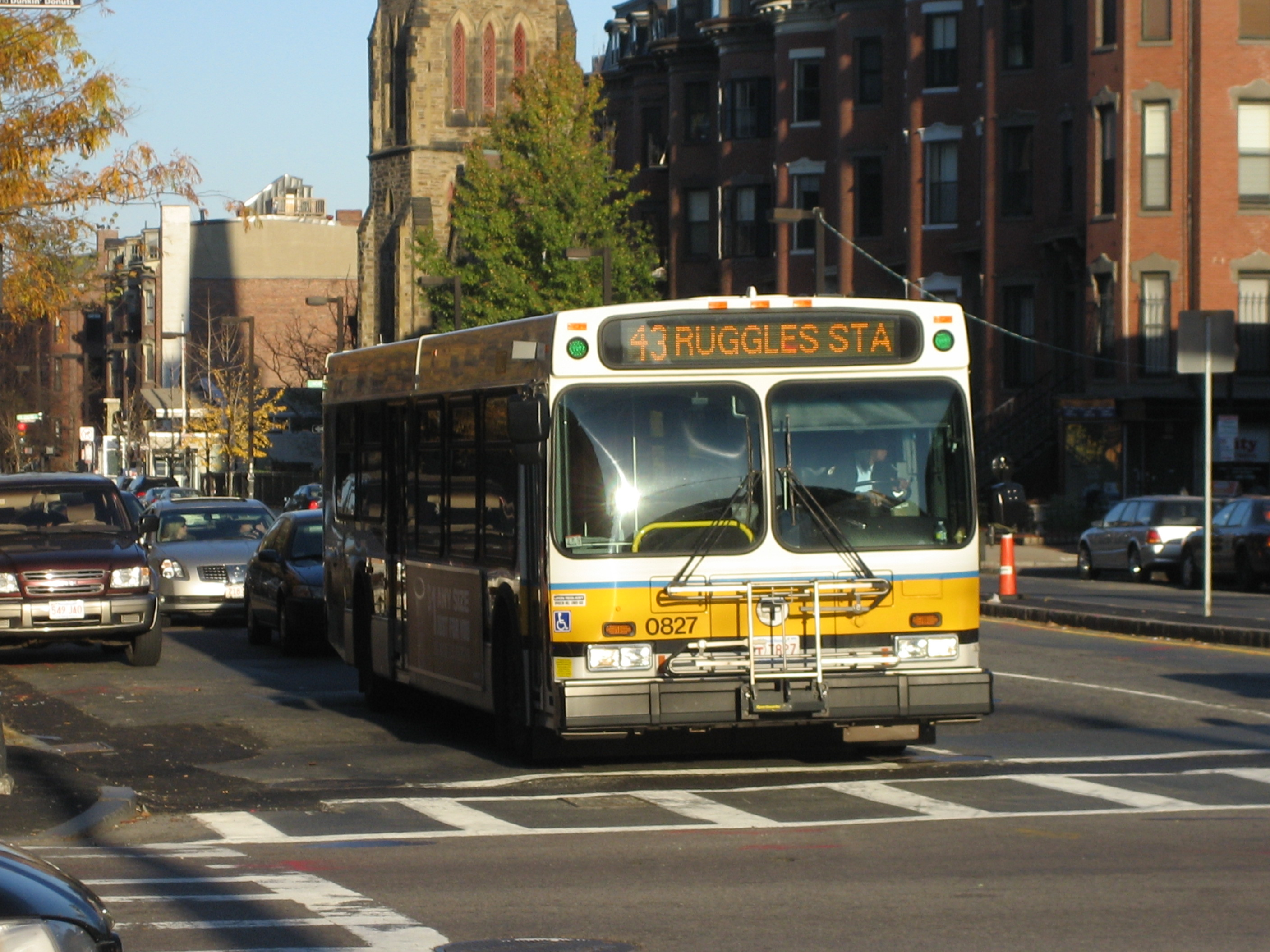
- A route 43 bus on Tremont Street in November 2009

Overview
- System: MBTA bus
- Garage: Cabot Garage

Route
- Locale: Boston, Massachusetts
- Start: Ruggles station
- End: Park Street station
- Length: 2.73 miles (4.39 km) southbound 2.21 miles (3.56 km) northbound
- Daily ridership: 975 (2018)

Route 43 is a local bus route in Boston, Massachusetts, operated by the Massachusetts Bay Transportation Authority (MBTA) as part of MBTA bus service. The route runs southwest from downtown Boston along Tremont Street, ending at the Ruggles bus terminal and Orange Line transfer point. It is notable as the last streetcar service to use the since-covered-over Pleasant Street incline before its bustitution; until the new Southwest Corridor relocation of the southern Orange Line opened in May 1987, the route continued down Tremont Street and Columbus Avenue to Egleston (on the old Washington Street Elevated).

== History ==
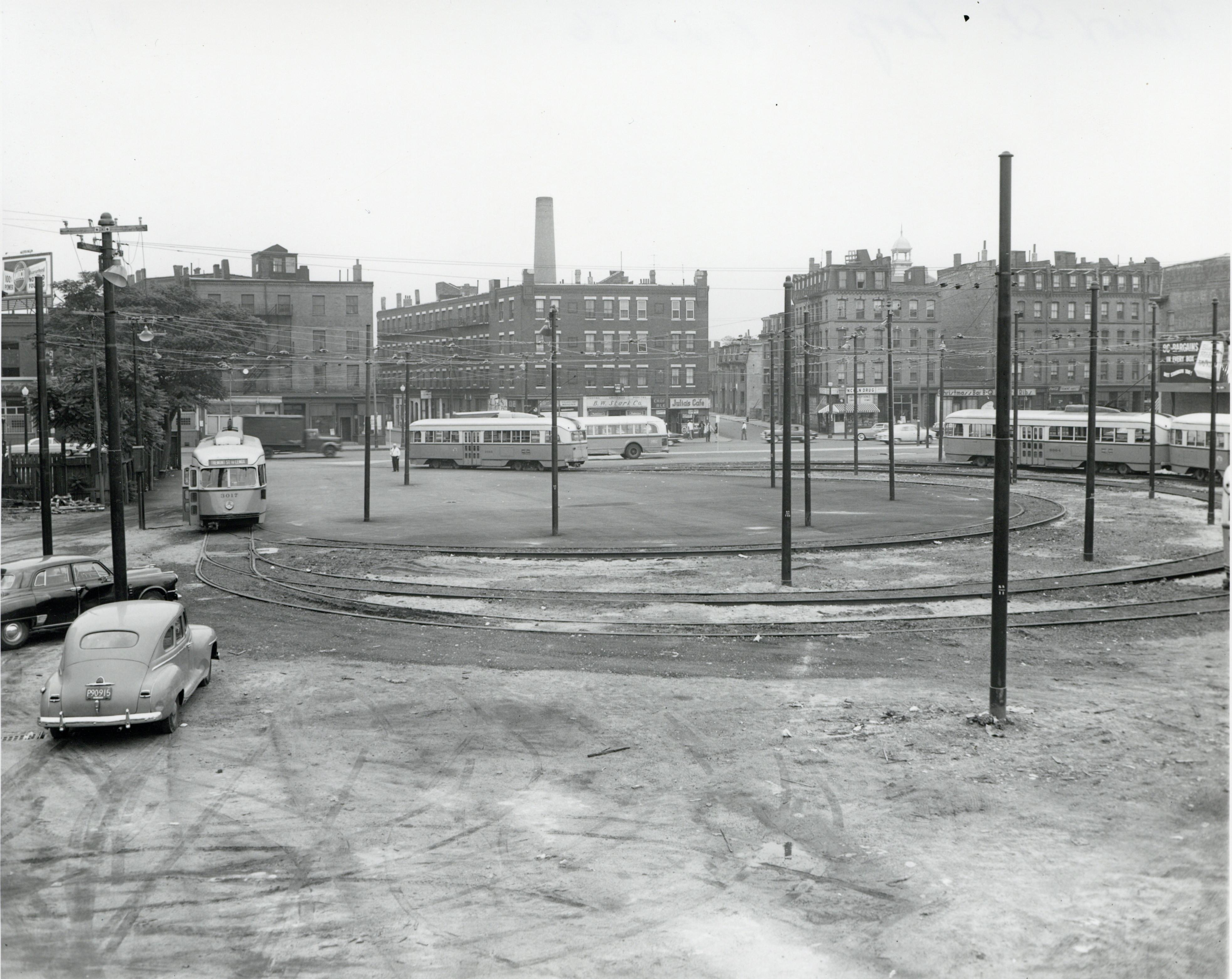
Route 43 trolleys at the Lenox Street loop in August 1956, two months after the loop became the new outbound terminus of the line

Trackage along Tremont Street and Columbus Avenue was originally built in 1857 by the West Roxbury Railroad to provide service to Jamaica Plain (see Green Line "E" branch for more about that line). It used Tremont Street and Columbus Avenue from downtown to Centre Street. Soon afterward, in 1859, a branch of this line was built west along Tremont Street to Brookline (this later became part of the 66).

The Tremont Street subway opened to the four-track Pleasant Street incline on October 1, 1897, and the western two tracks were connected to those running to the south along Tremont Street. However, between June 10, 1901, and November 29, 1908, the Main Line Elevated ran through the incline into the Tremont Street subway, and Tremont Street streetcars again ran along the surface; this ended when the Elevated gained its own tunnel under Washington Street in 1908, and the Tremont Street subway reverted to streetcar operation. At some time around then (after 1888), the tracks were extended the rest of the way to Egleston (and beyond, along Seaver Street).

After March 1, 1953, the last day the 9 to City Point ran, the 43 was shifted to the two eastern tracks to allow a bus transfer facility to be built where the western tracks had been. By this time, service ran to North Station, turning around on the lower-level loop at that station. Streetcars last ran to Egleston on June 14, 1956, after which they were cut back to Lenox Street, with a new bus route (also numbered 43) running between Lenox Street and Egleston. Service to Lenox Street ended on November 19, 1961, and the bus was extended north past the Pleasant Street incline to Boylston. A shuttle service was kept between the portal and Boylston, with one double-ended PCC streetcar on each track. This shuttle last ran April 5, 1962.

On February 26, 1966, the 43 was cut back to Stuart Street due to the temporary closure of Tremont Street. This terminus was kept until June 1972, when service was extended north around Boston Common to Park Street. With the opening of the new southern portion of the Orange Line in May 1987, the south end of the 43 was truncated to Ruggles, with extensions of the 22 and 29 providing service between Ruggles and Egleston (the latter having been reduced to a bus stop with the closure of the Washington Street Elevated).
