= Park Place station =

Park Place station may refer to:

- Park Place station (BMT Franklin Avenue Line), a New York City Subway station in Brooklyn; serving the S (Franklin Avenue Shuttle) train
- Park Place station (IRT Broadway–Seventh Avenue Line), a New York City Subway station in Manhattan; serving the 2 and 3 trains
- Park Place station (IRT Sixth Avenue Line), a former New York City Subway station in Manhattan; now demolished
- Park Place station (Newark), a former rapid transit station in New Jersey; now demolished

== See also ==
- Park Street station (disambiguation)
- Park station (disambiguation)
