= Tremont Street =

Road in Boston, Massachusetts

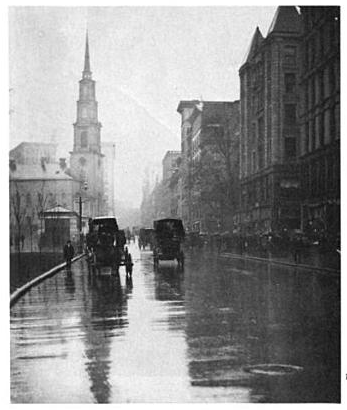
- Tremont Street and Park St. Church in 1915
- Interactive map of Tremont Street
- Former name: Treamont Street
- Namesake: Trimountaine
- Owner: City of Boston
- Location: Boston, Massachusetts, U.S.
- Nearest metro station: Government Center; Park Street; Boylston; Tufts Medical Center; Roxbury Crossing; Brigham Circle
- North end: Government Center, Boston
- South end: Brigham Circle

Tremont Street is a major thoroughfare in Boston, Massachusetts.

Tremont Street begins at Government Center in Boston's city center as a continuation of Cambridge Street, and forms the eastern edge of Boston Common. Continuing in a roughly southwesterly direction, it passes through Boston's Theater District, crosses the Massachusetts Turnpike, and becomes a broad boulevard in the South End neighborhood. It then turns to the west as a narrower four-lane street, running through Mission Hill and terminating at Brigham Circle, where it intersects Huntington Avenue. The street name zigzags across several physical roads, often requiring a sharp turn to remain on the street, as a result of changes made to the street grid during urban renewal.

== Etymology ==
The name (/ˈtrɛmɒnt/, pronounced TREH-mont) is a variation of one of the original appellations of the city: "Trimountaine", a reference to a hill that formerly had three peaks. Beacon Hill, with its single peak, is all that remains of the Trimountain. Much of the Trimountain was removed, and the earth used as fill to expand the Shawmut Peninsula. The two smaller peaks, Cotton Hill (or Pemberton Hill, at what is now Pemberton Square) and Mt. Whoredom (or Mt. Vernon, formerly at the location of the modern-day Louisburg Square) no longer exist. The central peak, Sentry Hill, now called Beacon Hill, is smaller than the original peak, which reached approximately to the height of the top of the State House.

A British military map of Boston from 1775, prepared by a Lieut. Sir Thomas Hyde Page of His Majesty's Corps of Engineers, shows Beacon Hill, Mount Whoredom, and another unnamed hill all just above Beacon Street. There is a small street on the northeast corner of Boston Common called "Treamount Street" from School Street to Hanover Street, the precursor of modern Tremont Street, running north from what was then called Common Street (modern Tremont Street alongside the eastern border of Boston Common).

== Points of interest ==
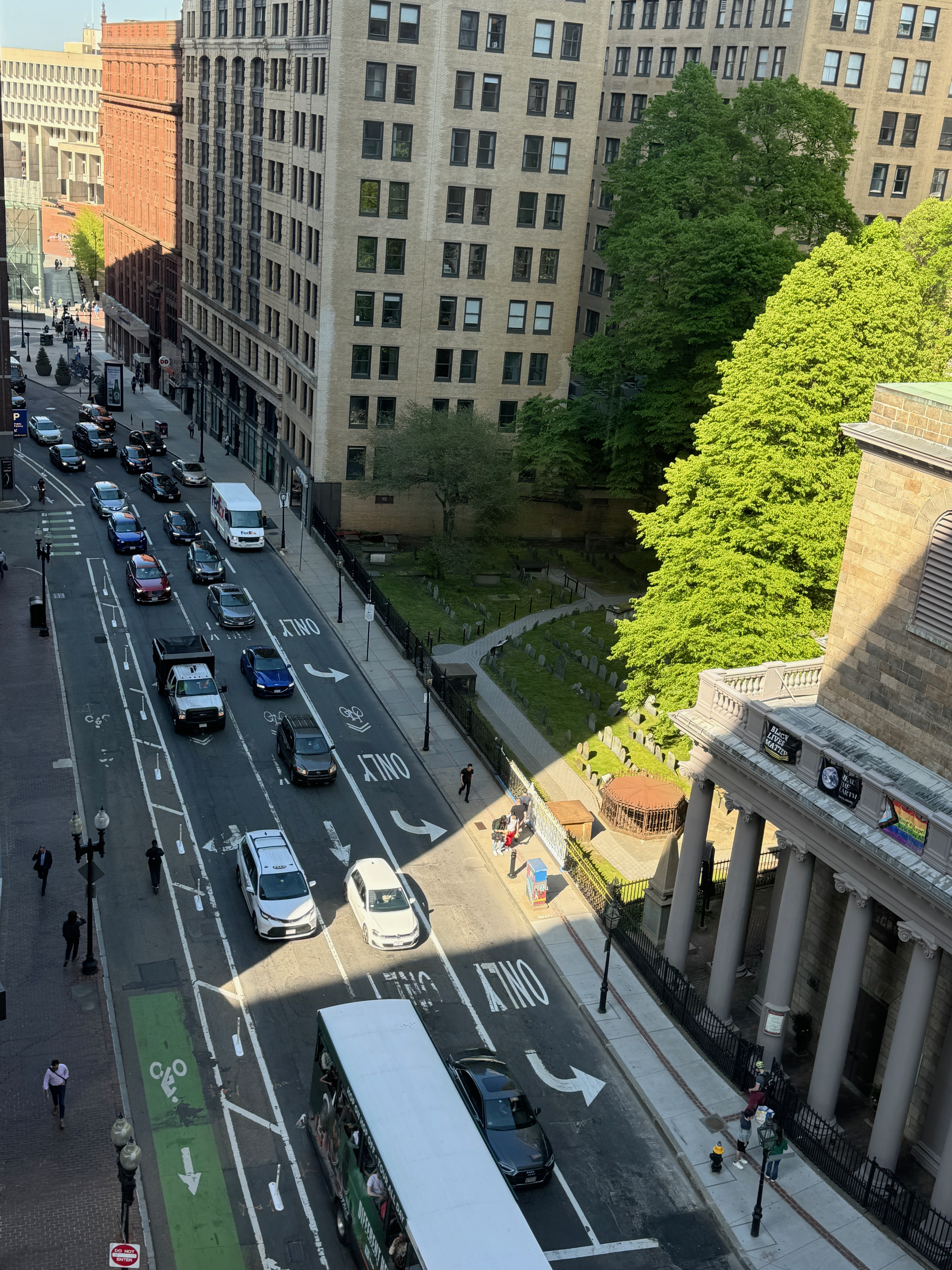
Tremont Street in front of King's Chapel and King's Chapel Burying Ground

Sites of interest along Tremont Street, from northeast to southwest, include:

- Government Center
- King's Chapel
- King's Chapel Burying Ground
- Tremont Temple
- Granary Burying Ground
- Suffolk University Law School
- Park Street Church
- Boston Common
- Emerson College
- Masonic Grand Lodge
- Boston Theater District
- Wang Center for the Performing Arts
- Boston Center for the Arts
- Our Lady of Perpetual Help Basilica

== Transportation ==
The Tremont Street subway runs underneath the street. Opened in 1897, it was the first subway tunnel in North America and still carries the MBTA Green Line.

The Green Line stops in three places under Tremont Street:

- Government Center
- Park Street
- Boylston

== Gallery ==
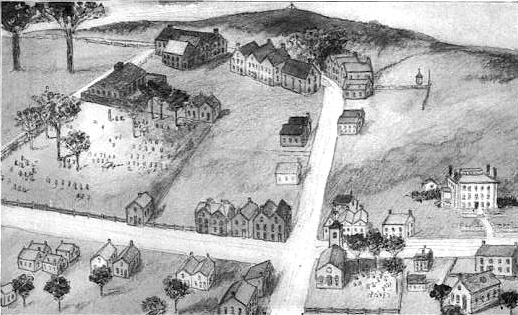
Intersection of Tremont and School Street (Boston Common at upper left), 1722

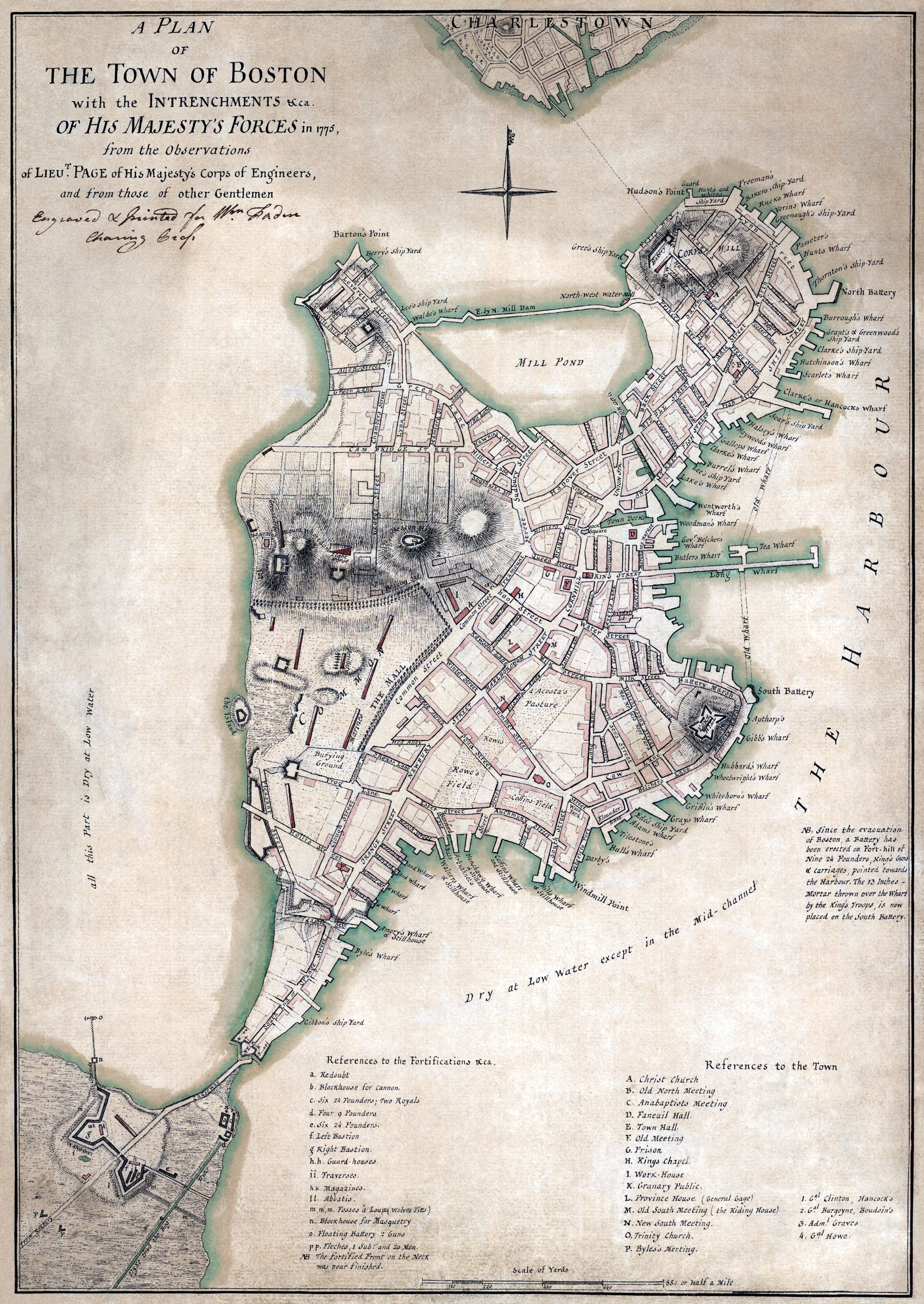
1775 map

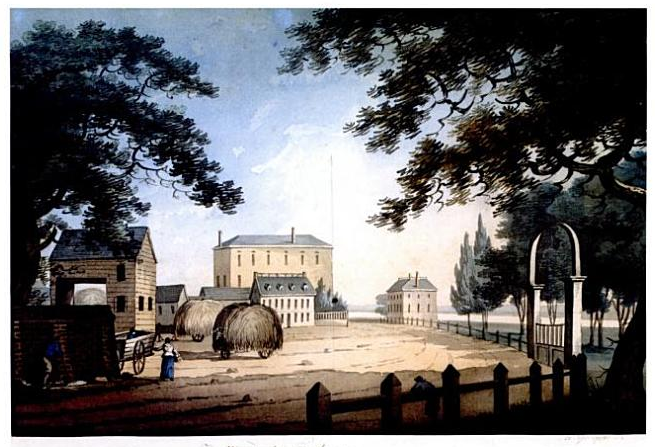
Tremont St., 1798

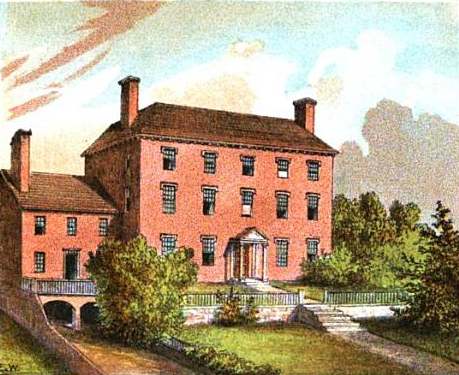
Faneuil mansion, c. 19th century

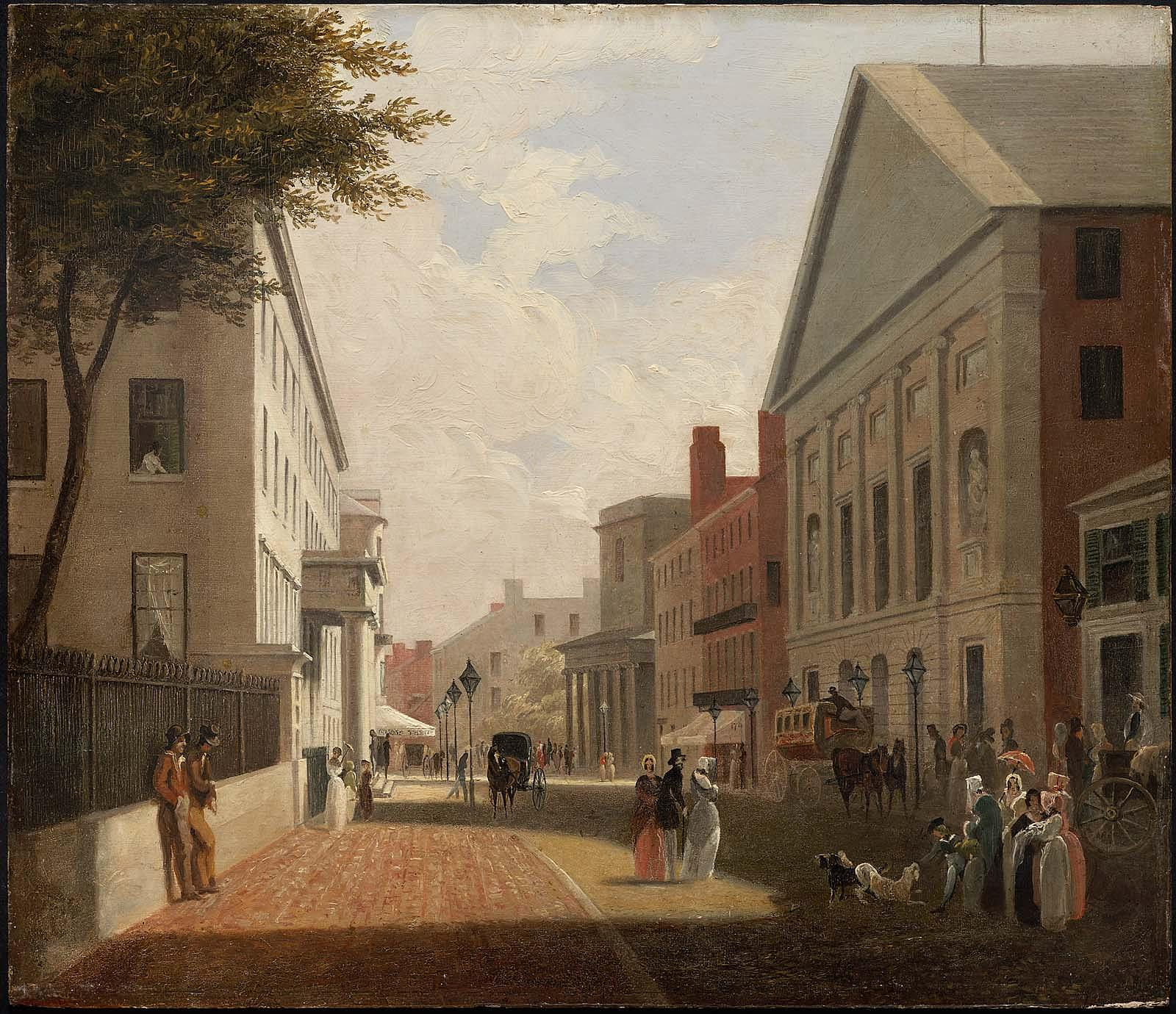
Tremont St., c. 1843, by Philip Harry

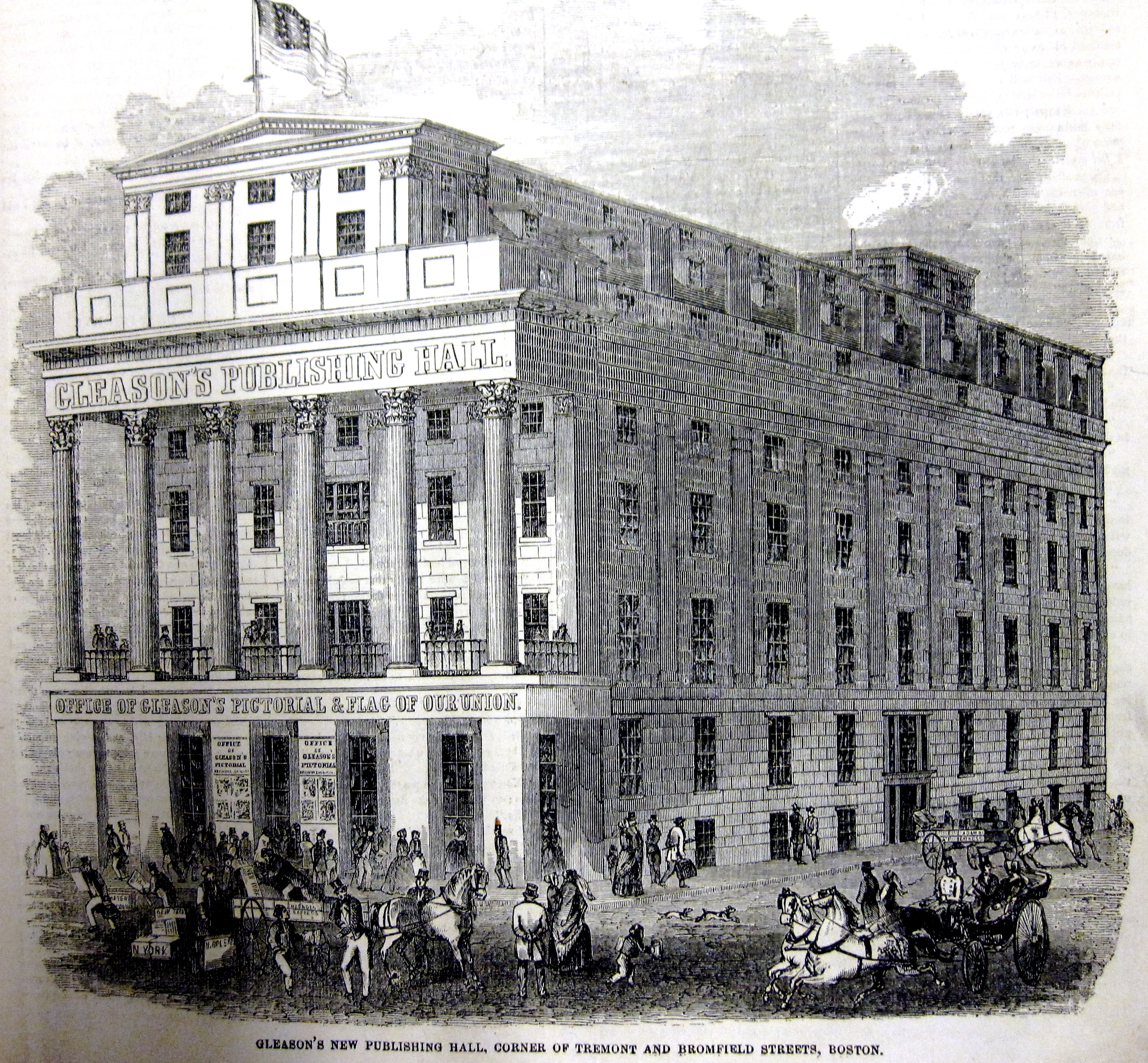
Gleason's Publishing Hall, corner of Tremont and Bromfield St., 1851

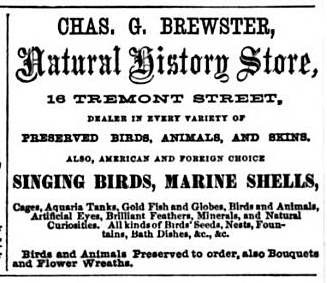
Advertisement for Chas. E. Brewster's Natural History Store, 1861

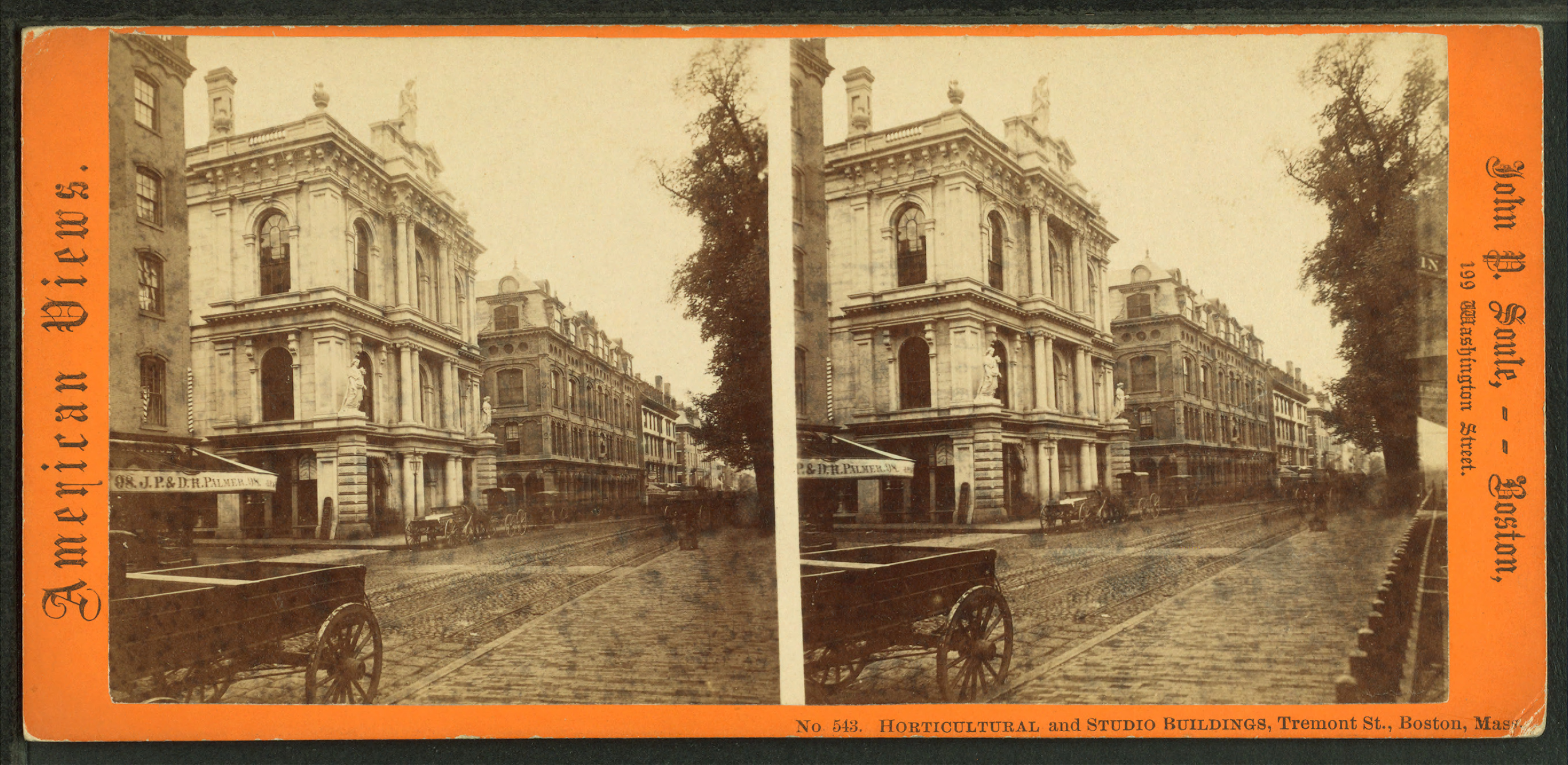
Horticultural Hall, 19th century, photo by John P. Soule

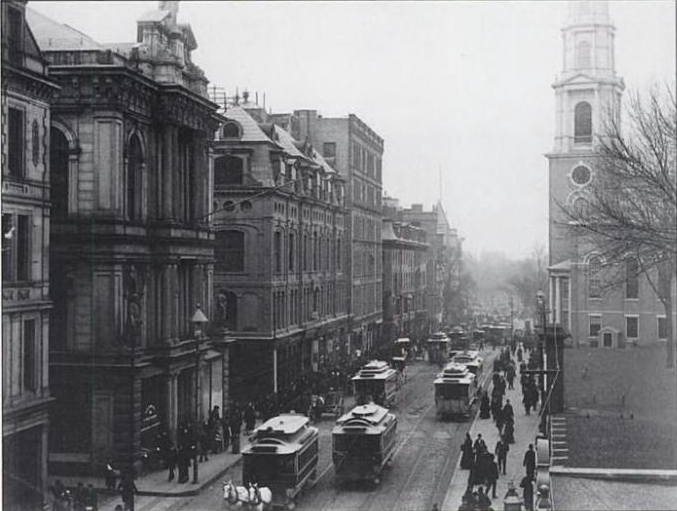
Tremont St., 1891

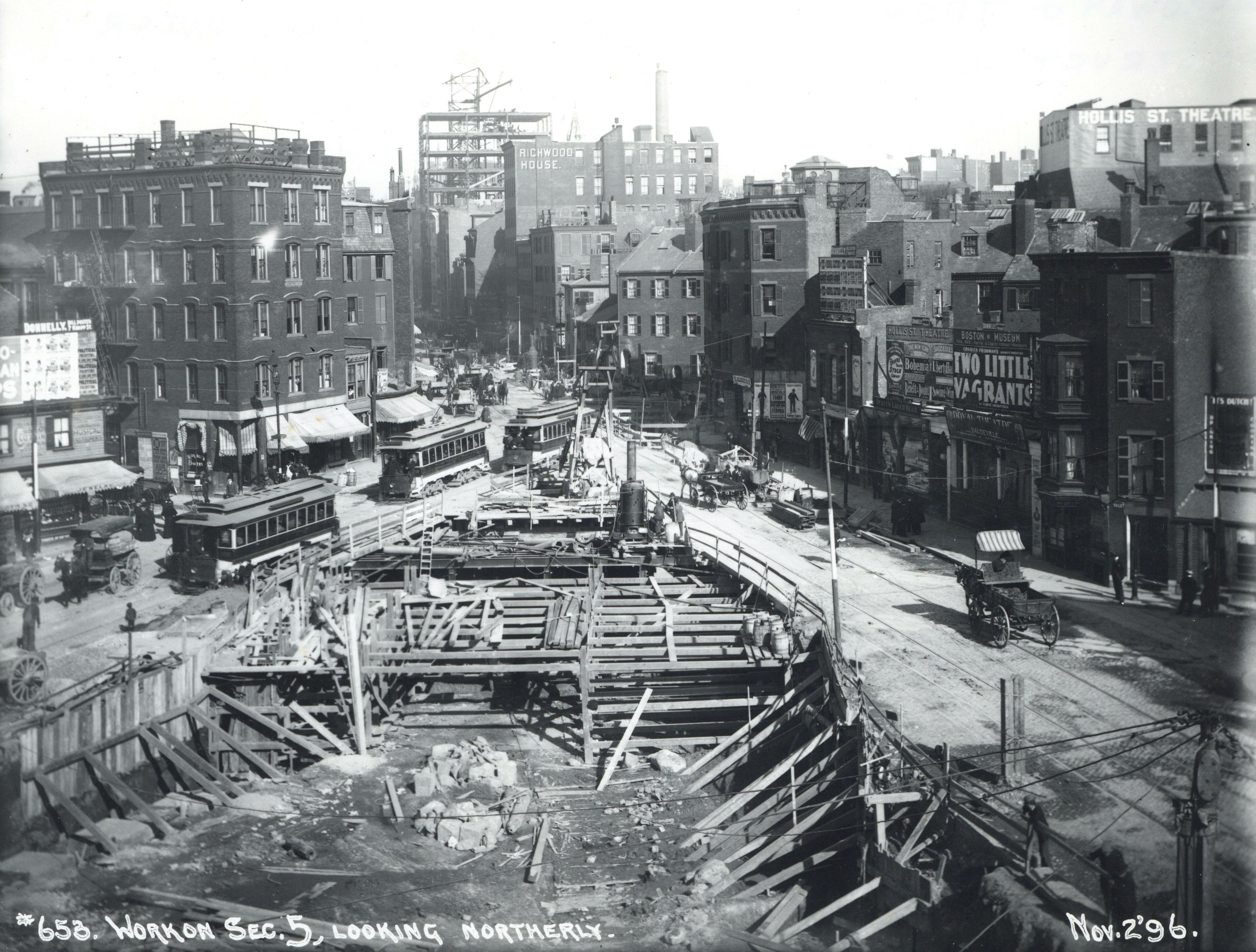
Intersection of Tremont St., Pleasant St., and Shawmut Ave., 1896

== See also ==
- Cathedral Church of St. Paul, Boston

Former tenants:

- Adams & Co. (Boston)
- Beacon Theatre, Boston, 20th century
- Boston Museum (theatre)
- Columbian Museum
- De Vries, Ibarra & Co.
- Gleason's Publishing Hall
- Louis P. Goullaud
- Hans Gram
- Gardiner Greene
- Haymarket Theatre (Boston, Massachusetts)
- Horticultural Hall (1865–1901)
- Hotel Boylston, 19th century
- Keith's Theatre (Boston)
- Mason & Hamlin
- National Theatre, South End
- Odd Fellows Hall, Boston, Tremont and Berkeley Streets
- S.S. Pierce Co.
- Provident Institution for Savings in the Town of Boston
- Studio Building (Boston, Massachusetts), no.110 Tremont
- Tremont House (Boston)
- Tremont Theatre, Boston (1889)
- William Verstille, portraitist
- Washington Gardens (Boston)
