= Pleasant Street incline =

Southern portal for the Tremont Street Subway

Coordinates: 42.3490°N 71.0660°W

The Pleasant Street incline or Pleasant Street portal was the southern access point for the Tremont Street subway in Boston, Massachusetts, which became part of the Green Line after the incline was closed. The portal and the section of tunnel connecting it to Boylston served streetcars from 1897 to 1901, Main Line Elevated trains from 1901 to 1908, and streetcars again from 1908 to 1962. The Pleasant Street incline is now abandoned, but plans have been floated at various times to reuse it.

== History ==
Map of the portal area, showing the former street configuration

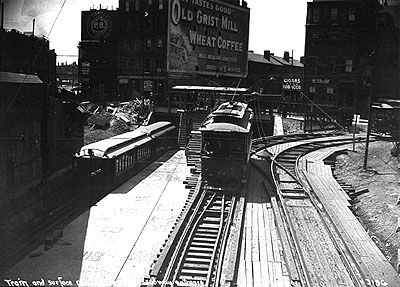
Pleasant Street portal in 1901 when the Main Line operated through the Tremont Street subway. An inbound Main Line (now Orange Line) test train is at the high platform at left, while an inbound trolley is on the right. This view faces south, away from the portal.

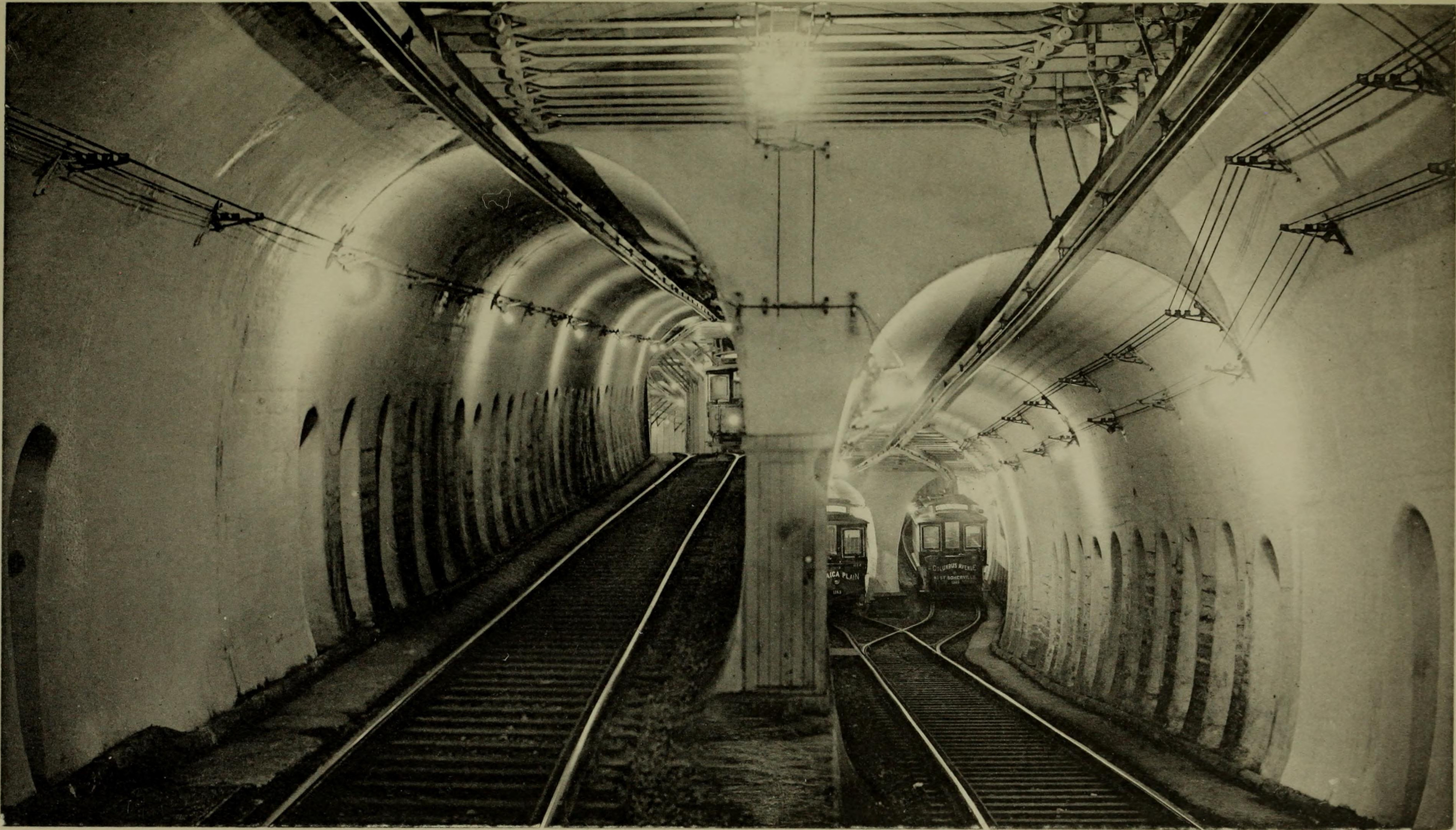
Looking south at the flying junction approaching the portal. The left branch goes to the inbound tracks from Shawmut Avenue/City Point and Tremont Street, the right branch to the outbound tracks to Shawmut Avenue/City Point (mid right) and Tremont Street (far right).

=== Early use ===
The incline opened on October 1, 1897, one month after the first section of the Tremont Street subway, allowing streetcar lines from Roxbury, Dorchester, and points south to operate via the subway. The new tunnel stretched from the outer tracks at Boylston south under Tremont Street, with a four-track portal in the triangle bounded by Tremont Street, Pleasant Street (later part of Broadway), and Shawmut Avenue. The tunnel carried two tracks, splitting into four tracks at a flying junction near the portal, with the northbound (western) track going over the southbound (eastern) track. The two western tracks continued down Tremont Street, while the eastern tracks turned east on Pleasant Street via Broadway to City Point in South Boston.

On June 10, 1901, streetcar service through the portal stopped, as the Washington Street Elevated (later part of the Orange Line) was connected to the two outermost tracks. El trains came out of the portal, stopped at a new Pleasant Street station with a center island platform in an open cut, passed under Pleasant Street, and then rose onto an elevated structure. Many surface streetcar lines were truncated to Dudley, the south end of the new El, until late November 1909.

After the Washington Street Tunnel opened on November 30, 1908, the elevated trains were rerouted through it, and the streetcars returned to the incline by their old routes, while the Pleasant Street station closed.

=== Decline ===
The abandoned tunnel in 2020.

On March 2, 1953, the City Point line was replaced by the route 9 bus. The tracks to Tremont Street, formerly connected to the west tracks of the portal, were realigned to the east tracks, allowing a bus transfer station to be built where the west tracks had been. The Tremont Street line was bustituted as route 43 on November 20, 1961, and a streetcar shuttle started between the portal and Boylston, with transfers to the subway. This shuttle was short-lived, ending with closure of the portal on April 6, 1962.

The Pleasant Street portal is now covered by Elliot Norton Park at the intersection of Tremont Street, Shawmut Avenue, and Oak Street West.

== Proposed reuse ==
Silver Line Phase III alternatives. The Tremont Street alignment (yellow) would have reused the former streetcar tunnel for buses.

Reuse of part of the tunnel for the Silver Line Phase III was briefly considered, but the narrow bore was found too small for the Silver Line buses which (unlike trolleys) are not fixed to their guideway. Plans for the Phase III tunnel were shifted further west to new alignments, then canceled due to questions over the project's cost-effectiveness.

The 2003 Program for Mass Transportation included the possibility of converting the Washington Street section of the Silver Line to Dudley Square to light rail (as had originally been promised) using the abandoned southern section of the subway to connect to the central subway at Boylston. However, the Phase III tunnel and continued bus service was recommended instead. In 2012, the Roxbury-Dorchester-Mattapan Transit Needs Study recommended the conversion to light rail and reuse of the tunnel as a long-term project, with the additional possibility of extending the line down Blue Hill Avenue to Mattapan along the #28 route.
