= Park Street =

Park Street may refer to:

== Places in England ==
- Park Street, Hertfordshire, a village
- Park Street, a location in Slinfold parish, West Sussex

== Streets in England ==
- Park Street, Bristol
- Park Street, Mayfair, London
- Former name of Parks Road, Oxford

== Streets elsewhere ==
- Park Street, Boston, Massachusetts, USA
- Park Street, Kolkata, India
- Park Street, Sydney, Australia

== See also ==
- Park Street station (disambiguation)
