= Park Avenue station =

Park Avenue station may refer to:

- Park Avenue station (BMT Jamaica Line), a former elevated transit station in New York City, New York, United States
- Park Avenue station (Charlotte), a former trolley station in Charlotte, North Carolina, United States
- Park Avenue station (Montreal), historic station building in Montreal, Quebec, Canada
- Park Avenue station (Newark Light Rail), a subway station in Newark, New Jersey, United States
- Park Avenue station (Tri-Rail), a proposed commuter rail station in Lake Park, Florida, United States
- Southeast Park Avenue station, a light rail station in Oak Grove, Oregon, United States

== See also ==
- Park station (disambiguation)
