= Park Street station =

Park Street station may refer to:

- Park Street metro station (Kolkata) in Kolkata, India
- Park Street railway station (England), in Hertfordshire, England
- Parkville station (Connecticut) (known as Park Street during planning) in Hartford, Connecticut, US
- Park Street station (MBTA), in Boston, Massachusetts, US

== See also ==
- Park Street (disambiguation)
- Park Place station (disambiguation)
