= Parco =

Parco can refer to:

- Parco, Tibet, a town in China
- Parco (retailer), a chain of department stores primarily in Japan
- Parco Historic District (also known as Sinclair Historic District), Sinclair, Wyoming, United States
- Parco P.I., a reality television program
- Pak-Arab Refinery (PARCO), an energy company in Pakistan
- Jim Parco (born 1968), former United States Air Force lieutenant colonel
- John Parco (born 1971), Italian-Canadian ice hockey player and coach

== See also ==
- Parco is also Italian for "park". For the numerous articles on parks in Italy see:
- Parc (disambiguation)
- Park (disambiguation)
