= Portland Anarchist Road Care =

Anarchist road maintenance organisation

Portland Anarchist Road Care (PARC) was a road maintenance organization formed in 2017 by anarchists in Portland, Oregon, United States, with the intention of repairing potholes in that city's roads.

== Background ==
In the winter of 2016/17 Portland saw freezing rain, graupel, ice storms, snow storms and extended periods of freezing temperatures, which damaged the city's roads. By the end of February 2017 municipal workers had identified more than 1,000 potholes. In 2017 the Portland Bureau of Transportation (PBOT) launched a "patch-a-thon" to fast-track road repairs, but acknowledged that repairs to some roads would not be completed until summer 2017.

Other groups and initiatives with similar aims include one that began repairing potholes in Hamtramck, Michigan in 2015, and PDX Transformation, who placed traffic cones around bicycle lanes in Portland in 2016 to prevent other vehicles being driven on them.

== Beliefs and activities ==
The group's mission statement described their reasoning as follows:

- Because we believe in building community solutions to the issues we face, outside of the state.
- Because society portrays anarchists as only breaking windows and blocking roads.
- Because when faced with anarchism as a political theory, statists often ask "But who will fix the roads."
- Because the city of Portland refuses to adequately repair roads in a timely manner.

The statement goes on to call for "community oriented direct action" and criticizes the militarization of police. A member of the group explained to OregonLive.com: "As anarchists, we seek to bring about a society in which coercive hierarchies, such as government and capitalism ... no longer exist. To be exceptionally clear, anarchists do not desire chaos, we desire freedom and equality." They also argued that "By creating structures to serve the same purpose as state structures, such as our organization, we have the ability to show that government is not necessary for society to function, that we can have a truly free and liberated society". In an email to a Vice reporter, PARC organizers said "We waited around like everyone else, for the state to come in and fix the roads ... We finally realized that the state is not going to do enough, on a timeframe that is reasonable." They also said that while it was not their primary goal, they hoped to challenge negative perceptions of anarchism, and explained: "We want people to learn about anarchy by participating in anarchist efforts, or by those efforts effecting them in the real world, not just through some media filter."

PARC said they had received criticism from the left to the effect that they "should be tearing the streets up, rather than paving them", but that they found this approach to be "ableist, classist and antisocial."

As of March 2017, PARC had patched several potholes in the southeast of the city. Photographs of their efforts, in which their faces were covered, were posted on Facebook. In March 2017 the group said they intended to continue their work as long as they had the necessary resources and time. They also said they would explore options including mobilizing people to fix roads in their neighborhoods themselves, and working to increase the visibility of potholes, and may also expand into other forms of infrastructure repair. PARC did not consult the city government before taking action, and explained: "We aren't asking permission, because these are our streets. They belong to the people of Portland, and the people of Portland will fix them."

== Response ==
Local residents interviewed by KGW.com expressed support for PARC. Dylan Rivera, a spokesperson for PBOT, acknowledged the city's pothole problem but said it was unsafe for citizens to fix potholes themselves, and called for patience. Rivera said that unauthorized road repairs may be illegal, or may result in PARC being legally liable. He also expressed sympathy for the group and said the Bureau viewed PARC's actions as "an extension of the community mindedness of Portlanders", and suggested PARC undertake repairs to gravel roads in the city that are not maintained by PBOT.

== See also ==
- Anarchism in the United States
