= Parc station =

Parc station may refer to:

- Parc station (Montreal), a rapid transit and commuter rail station in Montreal, Quebec, Canada
- Parc metro station (Brussels), a rapid transit station in Brussels, Belgium
- Parc metro station (Charleroi), a rapid transit station in Charleroi, Belgium

== See also ==
- Park station (disambiguation)
