= Park Lane station =

Park Lane station may refer to:

- Park Lane station (DART), a light rail station in Dallas, Texas, USA
- Park Lane Interchange, a station on the Tyne and Wear Metro, Sunderland, England
- Park Lane railway goods station, in Liverpool, England
