= Le Parc =

Le Parc may refer to:

- Le Parc (album), 1985 album by Tangerine Dream
- Le Parc (ballet), 1995 ballet by Angelin Preljocaj
- Le Parc (novel), 1961 novel by Philippe Sollers
- Le Parc, Manche, a commune in Manche, Normandy, France
- Le Parc aux Bambous, park in Broques, Lapenne, Midi-Pyrénées, France
- Le Parc Figueroa Alcorta, residential complex in Buenos Aires, Argentina
  - Le Parc tower, Buenos Aires, Argentina; one of the two towers there.
- Le Parc (Ottawa), the fourth tallest building in the National Capital Region of Canada
- Nickname for the Parc des Princes in Paris
- Julio Le Parc (1928–2026), Argentine-French artist
