= Tremont Street subway =

MBTA subway tunnel in downtown Boston

- U.S. National Register of Historic Places
- U.S. National Historic Landmark
- The subway looking towards Park Street, as seen from the outbound platform at Boylston Station 2026

- Location within Boston Location within Massachusetts Location within the United States
- Location: Boston, Massachusetts
- Coordinates: 42°21′23″N 71°3′47″W
- Built: 1897
- Architect: Howard A. Carson
- Architectural style: Classical Revival
- NRHP reference No.: 66000788

Significant dates
- Added to NRHP: October 15, 1966
- Designated NHL: January 29, 1964

The Tremont Street subway in Boston's MBTA subway system is the oldest subway tunnel in North America and the third-oldest still in use worldwide to exclusively use electric traction (after the City and South London Railway in 1890, and the Budapest Metro's Line 1 in 1896), opening on September 1, 1897. With the tunnels construction authorized by the General Court, its construction was supervised by Howard A. Carson as chief engineer. Its primary objective was to get streetcar lines off the traffic-clogged streets instead of as a true rapid transit line, and its construction was partially influenced by the blizzard of 1888 which resulted in transportation gridlock. It now forms the central part of the Green Line, connecting Boylston Street to Park Street and Government Center stations.

== History ==
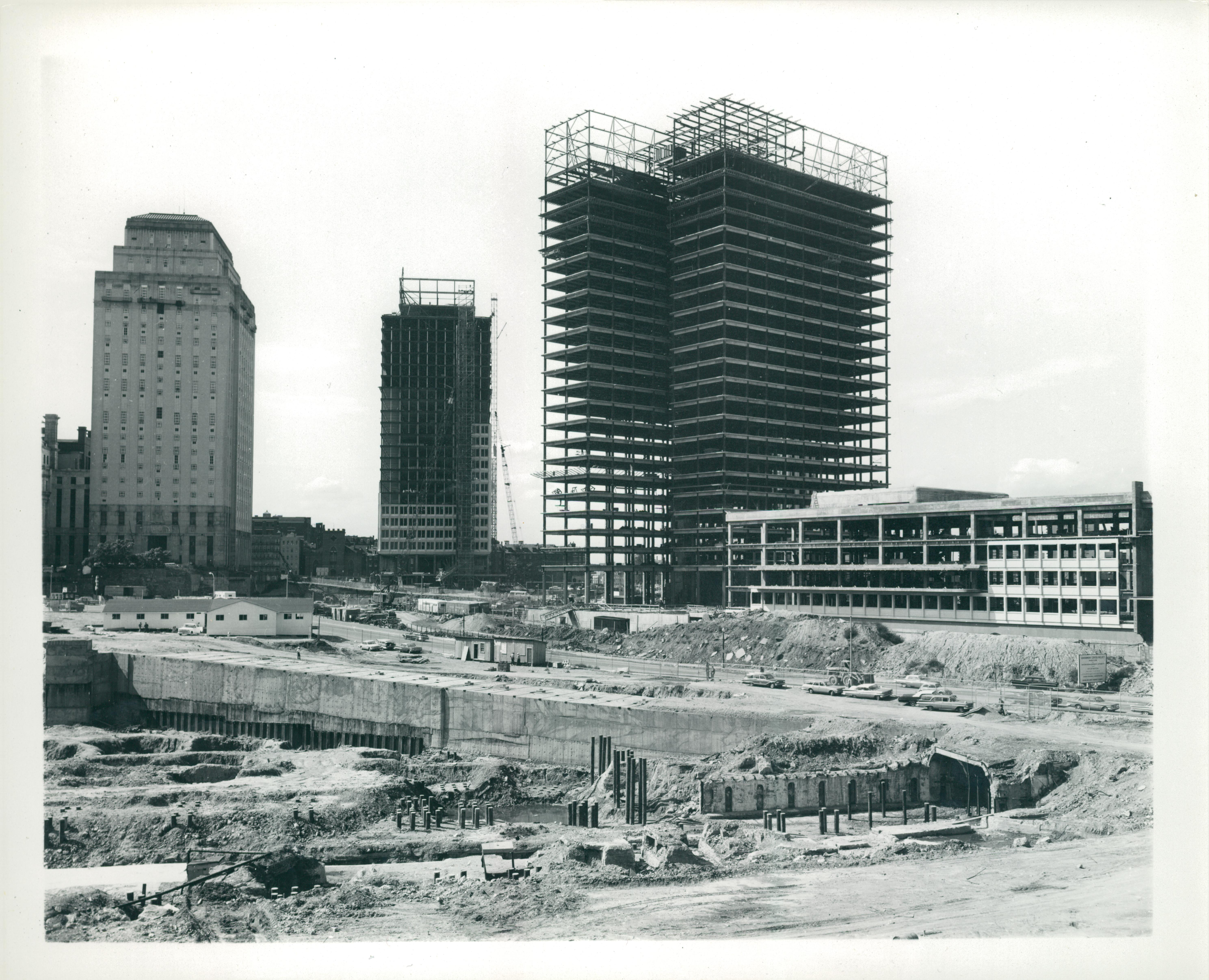
Part of the original northbound tunnel (bottom right) exposed during City Hall construction in 1964

The tunnel originally served five closely spaced stations: Boylston, Park Street, Scollay Square, Adams Square, and Haymarket, with branches to the Public Garden portal and Pleasant Street incline south of Boylston. Park Street, Scollay Square, and Haymarket stations were altered over the next two decades as transfers were added to the Cambridge–Dorchester subway, East Boston Tunnel, and Main Line Elevated (now part of the Red, Blue, and Orange Lines, respectively).

Boylston and Park Street were built with rectangular stone headhouses designed by Edmund M. Wheelwright that did not aesthetically match the Common. Scollay Square and Adams Square had similar baroque headhouses with four-sided clock towers. Unlike the interior decor, the headhouses were sharply criticized as "resembling mausoleums" and "pretentiously monumental". Later stations on the East Boston Tunnel and Washington Street Tunnel incorporated this criticism into their more modest headhouses.

In 1963, the northern part of the tunnel was extensively altered during the construction of Government Center and a new Boston City Hall on what had been the neighborhood of Scollay Square. The northbound tunnel to Haymarket station was rerouted to the west (the southbound tunnel is still original). Scollay Square station was rebuilt as Government Center station, and Adams Square station was closed. Much of the old northbound tunnel was filled in to support the City Hall foundation; another section was turned into a delivery tunnel. Another section was rediscovered by a City Hall employee in 1983; a 150-foot (46 m) piece was renovated for use as records storage. Three sections, separated by walls, remain of the abandoned northbound tunnel.

In 1971, the original Haymarket station was replaced with a new station just to the south.

=== Disused southern tunnel branch ===
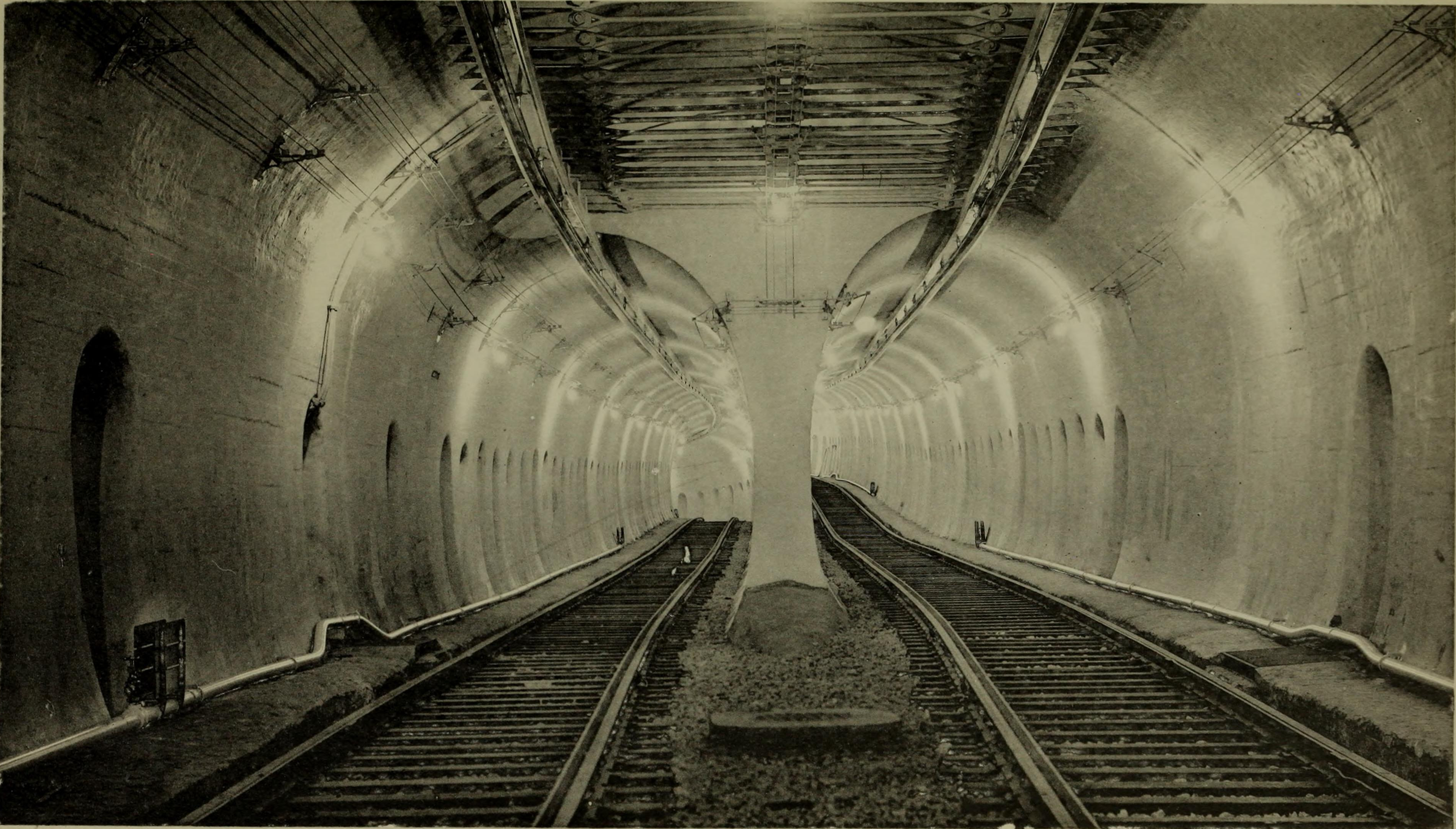
The now-unused southern portion of the Tremont Street subway in 1898, looking north towards Boylston – the outbound track's lower elevation takes it under the Boylston Street subway's sharply curved outbound tracks.

Same spot as seen in 2020.

The subway in 1897 consisted of a main line under Tremont Street running to Park Street, where is splits into two forks. One fork connects to the Boylston Street subway, which turns westward under Boylston Street. The other fork continues south under Tremont Street to the Pleasant Street incline. This portal was used by streetcars that went southwest to Egleston via the South End, along Tremont Street (route 43), or southeast to City Point in South Boston via Broadway (route 9). Streetcar service through the southern portal ended in 1962; for the last several months, service consisted of a shuttle between the portal and Boylston station. The tunnel still exists, dead-ended at the now-buried portal, which has been converted to a public park. However, there have been proposals for the disused tunnel to become part of a new streetcar line that would partly replace access to rapid transit for southern Metro Boston neighborhoods that lost rapid transit service in 1987 with the demolition of the Washington Street Elevated southern section of the Orange Line. This proposed new streetcar service could go as far south as the Red Line's Mattapan station, with a northern turnaround terminus at Government Center, according to a 2012-dated proposal.

== Portals ==
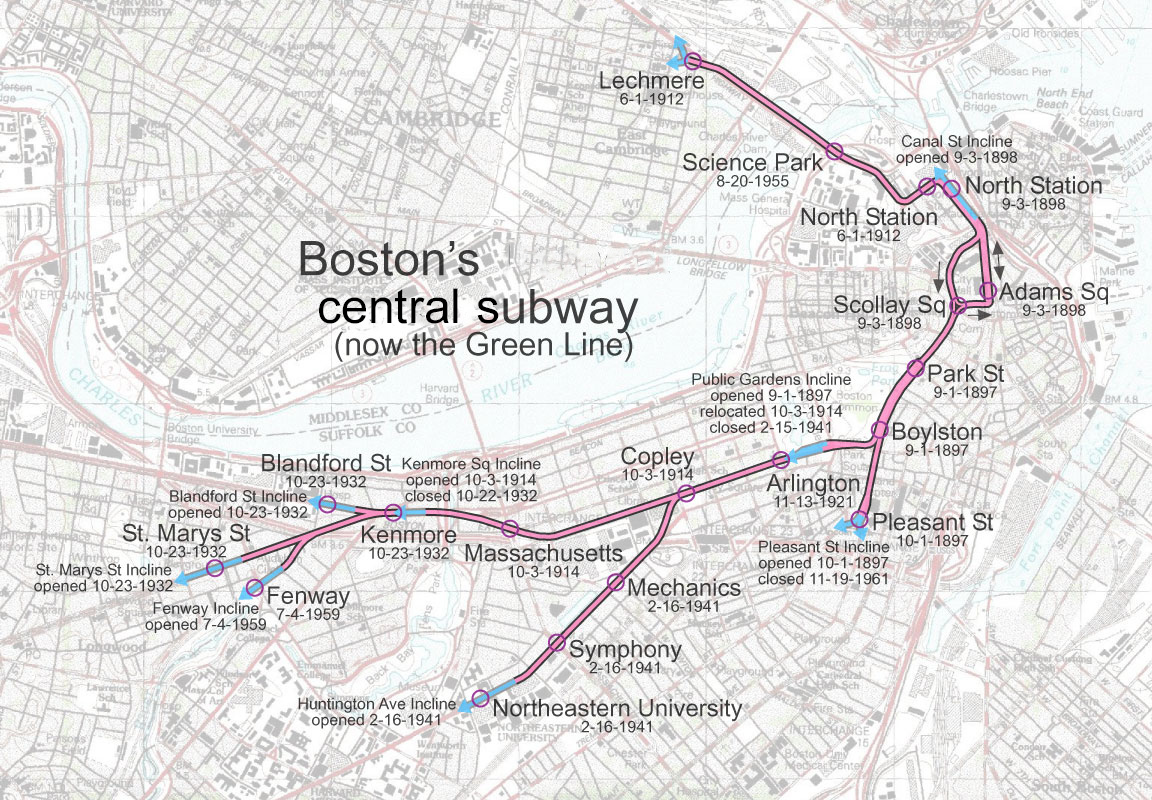
A map showing the extent of the Tremont Street subway over time

The three original tunnel entrances were in the Boston Public Garden, at North Station/Canal Street, and at Pleasant Street. Over time, these portals were replaced and abandoned as the subway was extended. Vestiges of various closed portals are still visible inside the main Green Line's Boylston Street subway tunnel extending west of Boylston station towards Kenmore Square station.

The western Public Garden portal was replaced in 1914 with two portals, one in the middle of Boylston Street adjacent to the old portal, and the other at the west end of the Boylston Street subway, just east of Kenmore Square. The Boylston Street portal was sealed in 1941 when the Huntington Avenue subway was opened (with a new portal at Northeastern University). The portal at Kenmore Square was replaced in 1932 when the subway was extended west beyond the Square, to the existing portals on Commonwealth Avenue (the "B" branch) and Beacon Street (the "C" branch), although the top arch of the original portal survives as part of a ventilation shaft. The Fenway portal for the D branch was opened in 1959.

The northern portal at Canal Street was replaced in 2004 when the subway was extended beneath North Station to a new portal next to Martha Road.

The southern portal at Pleasant Street was abandoned in 1962 following the end of streetcar service through the South End. The portal has since been sealed up and covered by Elliot Norton Park, but the dead-ended tunnel to Boylston survives underground, for a possibility of future re-use (see above).

== Power ==
The subway uses trolleys powered by electricity from overhead lines, which had been made possible by the invention of the trolley pole in 1880 by Frank J. Sprague, from his design for the Richmond Union Passenger Railway. The line has been pantograph-only since the trolley wires were modified in the 1990s.

== Landmark status and ownership ==
The Tremont Street subway was designated a National Historic Landmark in 1964, in recognition for its pioneering role in the development of the subway as a public transit system in the United States. The landmark designation encompasses the still-extant portions of the early tunnel, roughly from Court Street to Charles Street, and includes the original Classical Revival head houses of the Park and Boylston stations which are still in use. In 1978, the American Society of Civil Engineers designated the Tremont Street subway tunnel as a National Historic Civil Engineering Landmark.

The original owner of the Tremont Street subway was the private West End Street Railway, later the Boston Elevated Railway. Public ownership began in 1947 with the Metropolitan Transit Authority, now the Massachusetts Bay Transportation Authority.

== See also ==
- List of National Historic Landmarks in Boston
- National Register of Historic Places listings in northern Boston, Massachusetts
