= Statue of A. Philip Randolph =

Statue in Boston

A. Philip Randolph
- The statue in 2026
- Location: Back Bay station, Boston, Massachusetts, United States
- Designer: Tina Allen
- Type: Statue
- Material: Bronze
- Height: 9 feet (2.7 m)
- Dedicated date: October 8, 1988
- Dedicated to: A. Philip Randolph

A. Philip Randolph is a bronze statue inside the Back Bay station of Boston, Massachusetts, United States. It was designed by sculptor Tina Allen and depicts its namesake, a civil rights and labor activist, in a seated position. It was dedicated on October 8, 1988, and is located inside the station's waiting area.

== Design ==
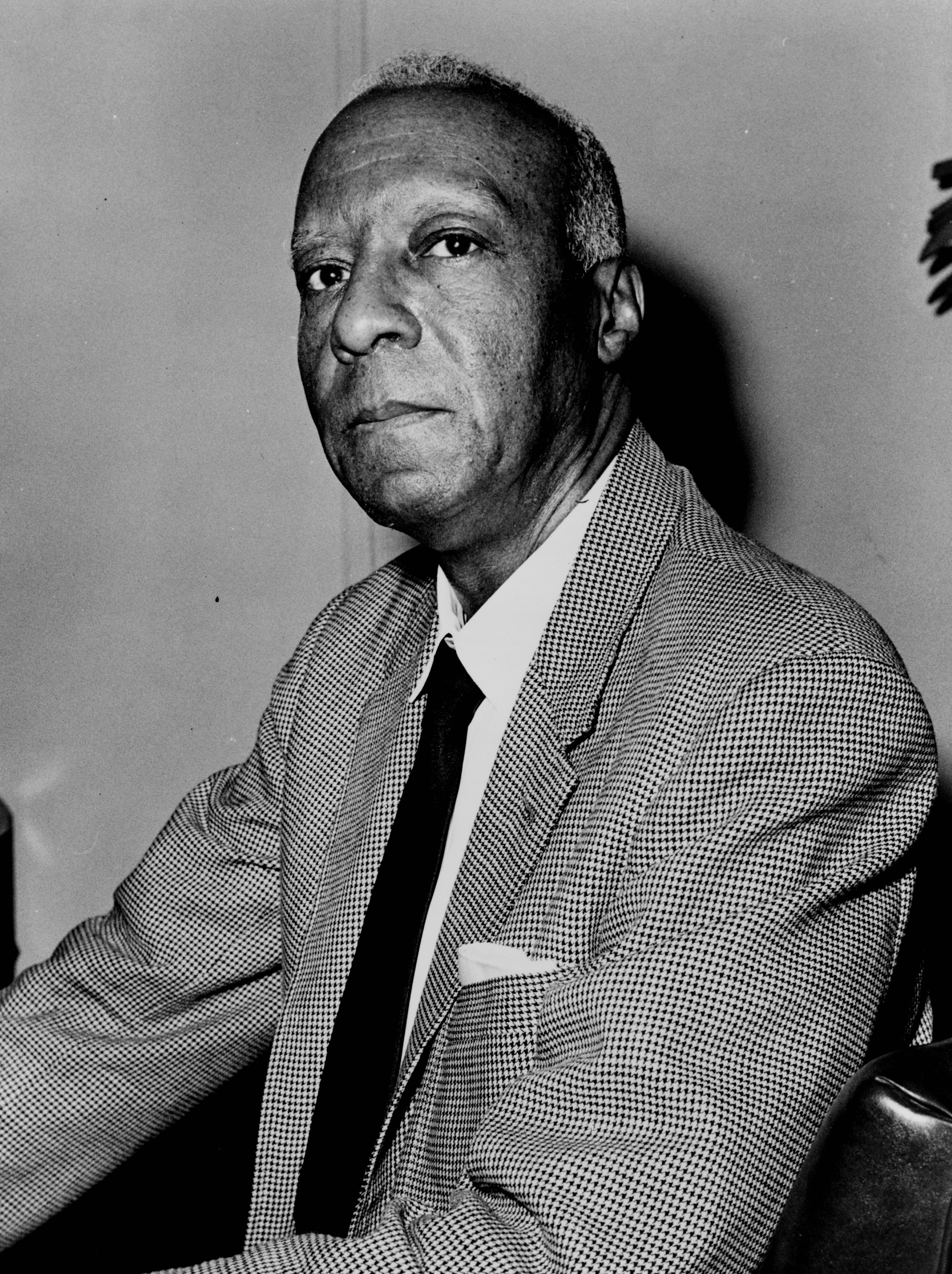
The bronze statue depicts A. Philip Randolph (pictured 1963).

The statue depicts A. Philip Randolph in a seated position, with a newspaper across his lap. He is dressed in a business suit and faces towards his right. The monument is roughly 9 feet (2.7 meters) tall and is made of bronze. The statue bears the signature of its designer, sculptor Tina Allen. In addition to the statue, there are six nearby panels dedicated to African American railroad workers in Boston.

== History ==
Randolph was an American civil rights and labor activist during the 20th century. Among other things, he is known as the founder of both the Brotherhood of Sleeping Car Porters, a labor union for African Americans, and the A. Philip Randolph Institute, and he also organized the 1963 March on Washington. He died in 1979. A statue commemorating him, to be erected inside of Boston's Back Bay station, was commissioned in 1986, with Allen as the designer. It was created as part of the Massachusetts Bay Transportation Authority's Arts on the Line program for public art. At the time, Boston was home to many former members of Randolph's union, with many living near the station. It was dedicated on October 8, 1988, in a ceremony featuring a group of former railroad workers. It is located in the station's waiting area. In a 1992 article published by the University of Massachusetts Boston, it was called the only statue in the city dedicated to a civil rights activist or labor activist.

== See also ==
- 1988 in art
- Civil rights movement in popular culture
- List of public art in Boston
