= Back Bay station =

Railway station in Boston, Massachusetts, US

Back Bay Station
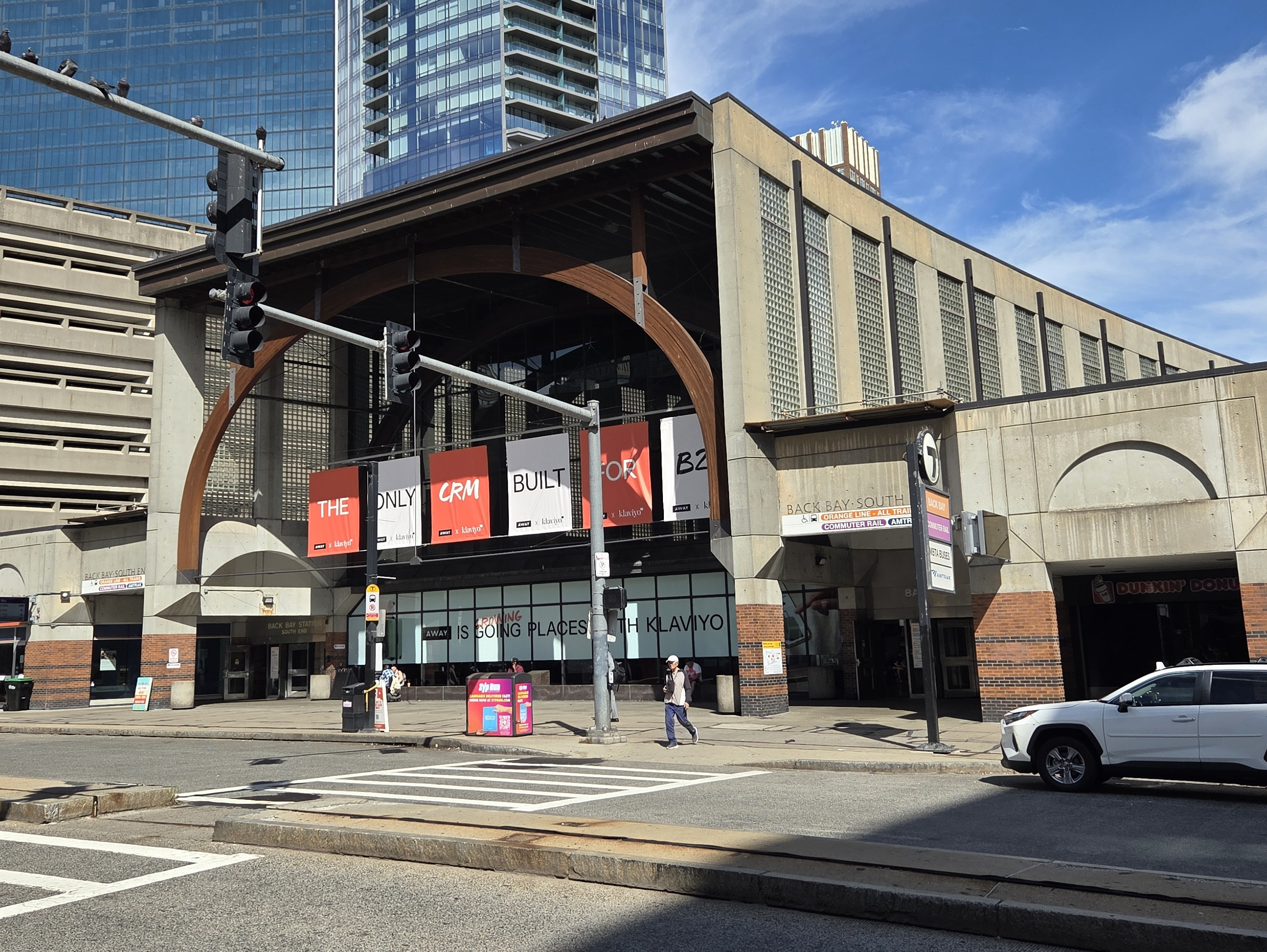
- The Dartmouth Street entrance to the station in 2025

General information
- Location: 145 Dartmouth Street; Boston, Massachusetts; United States
- Coordinates: 42.3476°N 71.0753°W
- Owner: Massachusetts Bay Transportation Authority
- Lines: Attleboro Line (Northeast Corridor); Southwest Corridor (Orange Line); Worcester Main Line
- Platforms: 1 island platform, 1 side platform (Northeast Corridor); 1 island platform (Orange Line); 1 island platform (Framingham/Worcester Line)
- Tracks: 3 (Northeast Corridor); 2 (Orange Line); 2 (Framingham/Worcester Line)
- Connections: MBTA bus: 10, 39

Construction
- Cycle facilities: 40 spaces in "Pedal and Park" bicycle cage; 30 outside spaces
- Accessible: Yes

Other information
- Station code: Amtrak: BBY
- IATA code: ZTY
- Fare zone: 1A (MBTA Commuter Rail)

History
- Opened: 1879 (Columbus Avenue); 1899 (Back Bay, Trinity Place, Huntington Avenue)
- Rebuilt: 1929; May 4, 1987 (modern station)

Passengers
- FY2019: 15,646 daily boardings (Orange Line)
- 2024: 6,786 daily boardings (Commuter Rail)
- FY 2025: 849,548 annual boardings and alightings (Amtrak)
Services
Preceding station	Amtrak	Following station
Route 128 toward Washington, D.C.	Acela	Boston South Terminus
Framingham toward Chicago	Lake Shore Limited	Boston South Terminus
Route 128 toward Norfolk, Newport News or Roanoke	Northeast Regional	Boston South Terminus
Preceding station	MBTA	Following station
Lansdowne toward Worcester	Framingham/Worcester Line	South Station Terminus
Ruggles toward Needham Heights	Needham Line	South Station Terminus
Ruggles toward Wickford Junction or Stoughton	Providence/Stoughton Line	South Station Terminus
Ruggles toward Forge Park/495 or Foxboro	Franklin/Foxboro Line weekdays	South Station Terminus
Dedham Corporate Center toward Foxboro	Foxboro event service	South Station Terminus
Massachusetts Avenue toward Forest Hills	Orange Line	Tufts Medical Center toward Oak Grove
Former services
Preceding station	New York Central Railroad	Following station
Newton toward Albany	Boston and Albany Railroad Main Line	Boston Terminus
Allston toward Albany	Boston and Albany Railroad Main Line	Boston Terminus
Longwood toward Riverside	Highland branch	Boston Terminus
Preceding station	MBTA	Following station
Mount Hope toward Dedham	Dedham Branch Closed 1967	South Station Terminus
Roslindale Village toward Millis	Millis Branch Closed 1967	South Station Terminus
Preceding station	New York, New Haven and Hartford Railroad	Following station
Forest Hills toward New Haven	Shore Line	Boston Terminus
Roslindale Village toward Woonsocket	Charles River Line	Terminus
Preceding station	Amtrak	Following station
Route 128 toward Newport News	Twilight Shoreliner	Boston South Terminus
Route 128 toward New Haven	Beacon Hill 1978-1979	Boston South Terminus
Route 128 toward Tri-State	Hilltopper	Boston South Terminus
Route 128 toward Harrisburg	Valley Forge 1974-1975, weekends only	Boston South Terminus
Newtonville toward Philadelphia	Bay State	Boston South Terminus
Route 128 toward St. Petersburg or Miami	Meteor	Boston South Terminus
Proposed services
Preceding station	MBTA	Following station
Ruggles toward Battleship Cove or New Bedford	South Coast Rail Phase 2 (2030)	South Station Terminus
Track layout
- Streets and I-90 (Mass Pike) are omitted
Location

Back Bay station (also signed as Back Bay · South End) is an intermodal passenger station in Boston, Massachusetts. It is located just south of Copley Square in Boston's Back Bay neighborhood, in close proximity to the South End. It serves MBTA Commuter Rail and MBTA subway routes, and also serves as a secondary Amtrak intercity rail station for Boston. The present building, designed by Kallmann McKinnell & Wood, opened in 1987. It replaced the New Haven Railroad's older Back Bay station – which opened in 1928 as a replacement for an 1899-built station – as well as the New York Central's Huntington Avenue and Trinity Place stations which had been demolished in 1964.

Although South Station is Boston's primary rail hub, Back Bay maintains high traffic levels due to its location in the Back Bay neighborhood near the Prudential Center development and its access to important Northeast Corridor services. All Amtrak Acela Express and Northeast Regional trains running to and from South Station stop at Back Bay, as does the Boston section of the Lake Shore Limited. Four MBTA Commuter Rail routes – the Providence/Stoughton Line, Franklin/Foxboro Line, Needham Line, and Framingham/Worcester Line – also stop at Back Bay, as do the Orange Line subway and several local MBTA bus routes. It is the third-busiest MBTA Commuter Rail station (after North Station and South Station) and the sixth-busiest MBTA subway station.

== Station layout ==
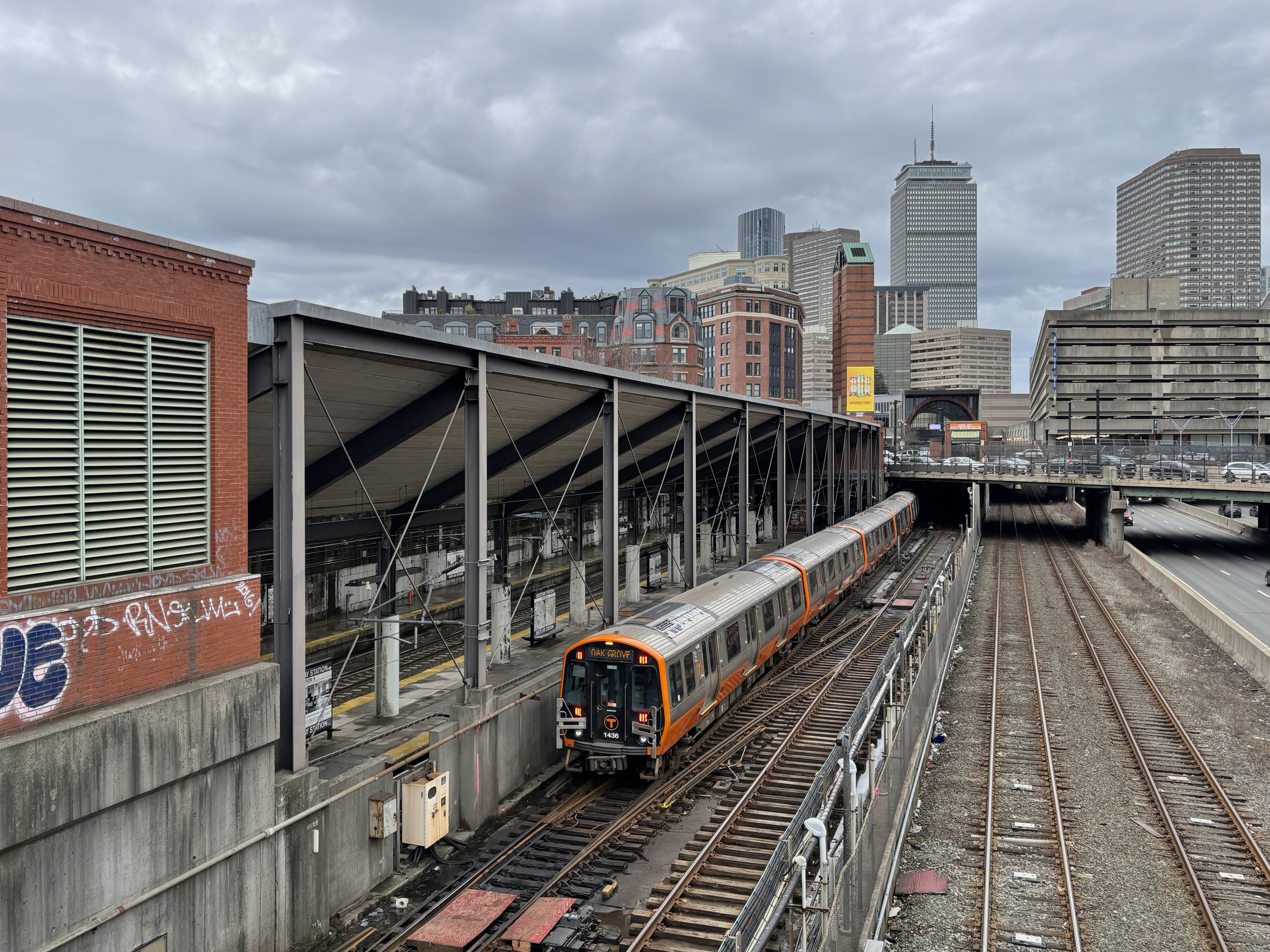
The station as seen from Berkeley Street, looking west. From left to right: Tracks 2, 1, 3; Orange Line tracks and train; Tracks 5 and 7.

There are 5 tracks serving Amtrak and commuter rail service. Tracks 2, 1, and 3 (in order south to north) serve Amtrak's Acela Express and Northeast Regional plus the MBTA's Providence/Stoughton Line, Franklin/Foxboro Line, and Needham Line. Tracks 5 and 7 serve the Framingham/Worcester Line and the Lake Shore Limited from a separate island platform. Tracks 1 and 2 are considered the primary mainline tracks; the track numbering scheme used in the Boston area uses only odd numbers for additional tracks on the Track 1 side (hence Tracks 3, 5, and 7) and even numbers for tracks on the Track 2 side. The Orange Line tracks and platform lie between these two groups of mainline rail tracks.

Back Bay is fully accessible. The station has full-length high-level platforms on the three Northeast Corridor tracks, and a mini-high platform for the Worcester Line tracks. Elevators are available to access all platforms from the street-level station building.

The main station building is located between Dartmouth Street and Clarendon Street; however, there are secondary exits from the platforms onto Dartmouth Street, Clarendon Street, and Columbus Avenue. The Dartmouth Street Underpass connects the Copley Place shopping mall with the main station building. The underpass was closed from March 6, 2016 to June 1, 2017 during construction at Copley Place, during which it was given some refurbishment.

The station includes several pieces of public art:

- A. Philip Randolph by Tina Allen – a bronze sculpture located in the waiting room
- A.P.R. & Boston's African American Railroad Workers –a set of interpretive panels in the concourse
- Farewell to Steam by George Greenamyer – a cast iron sculpture located on the platform level
- Neons for Back Bay Station by Stephen Antonakos – a set of three neon sculptures in the concourse

== History ==
=== Previous stations ===
The Boston and Worcester Railroad opened from downtown Boston to Newton in 1834, and to Worcester within the next several years. The Boston and Providence Railroad opened from Park Square to East Providence later that year. The two lines crossed on causeways in the Back Bay, then still used as a mill pond. On or just before January 1, 1879, the Boston and Albany Railroad (descendant of the B&W) opened its Columbus Avenue station to serve new developments on the filled bay. It was a small corrugated iron building on the north side of the tracks just east of the Columbus Avenue bridge. In 1897, the New Haven Railroad (which owned the Boston and Providence and leased the Old Colony Railroad), the New York and New England Railroad, and the Boston and Albany formed the Boston Terminal Company to consolidate their four terminals into a new union station.

Simultaneous with the construction of the resulting South Station in 1899, the New Haven also built its first Back Bay Station just east of Dartmouth Street to compete with the B&A's Columbus Avenue station. Back Bay station opened on September 19, 1899 – the same day that Providence Division trains began using South Station. The next year, the B&A replaced Columbus Avenue station with the westbound-only Trinity Place and eastbound-only Huntington Avenue stations.

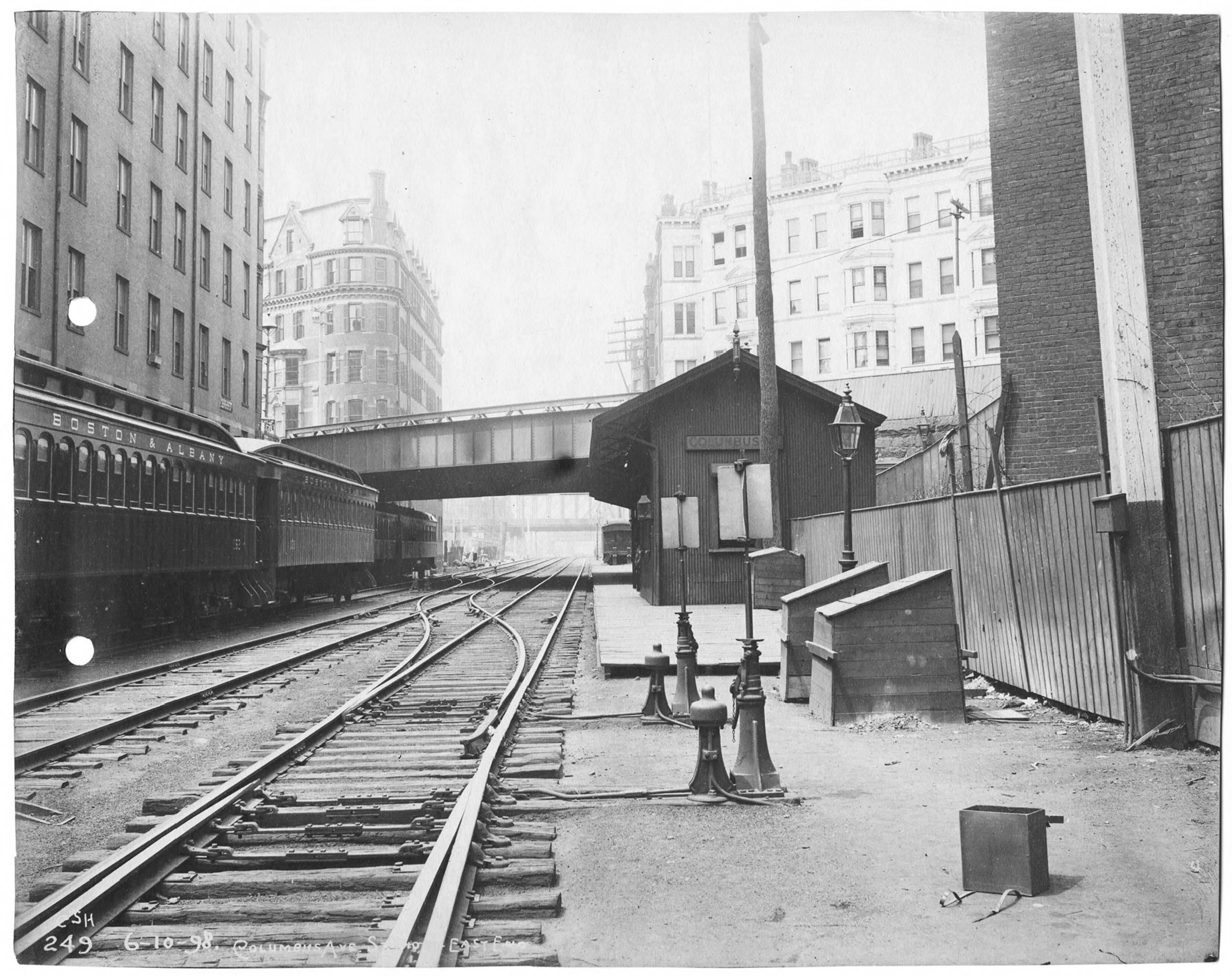
Columbus Avenue station in 1898

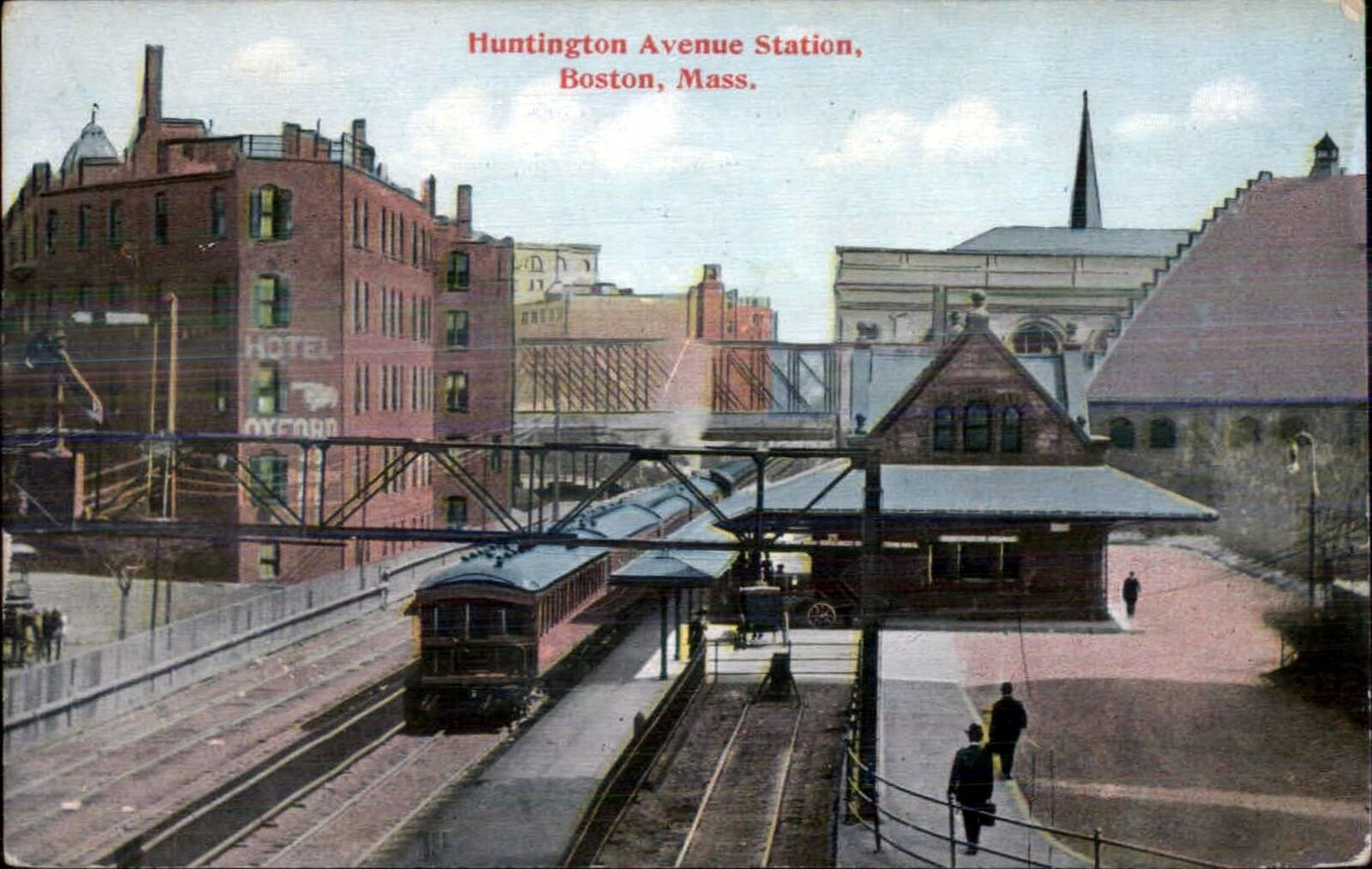
Huntington Avenue station around 1910

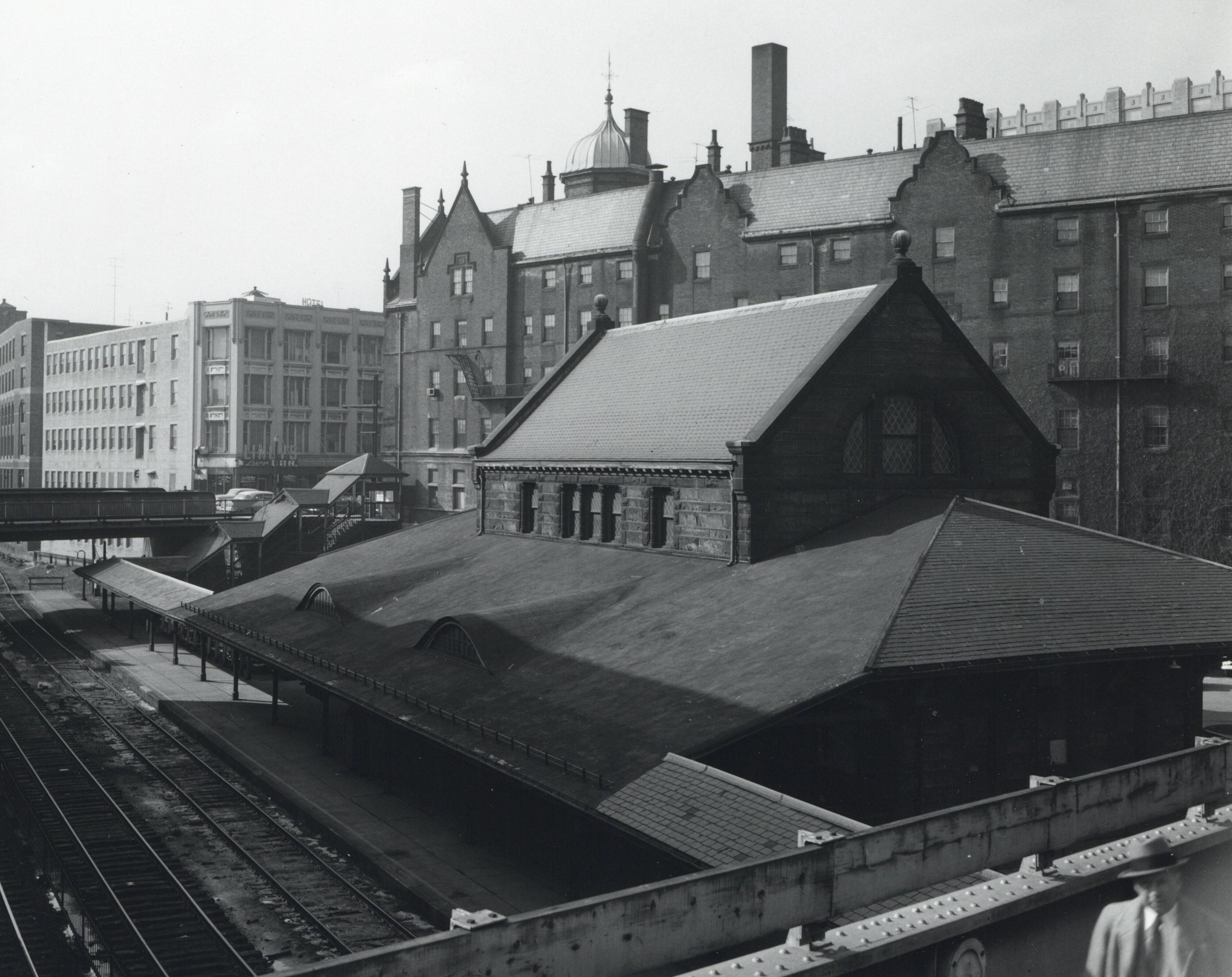
Trinity Place station around the 1940s

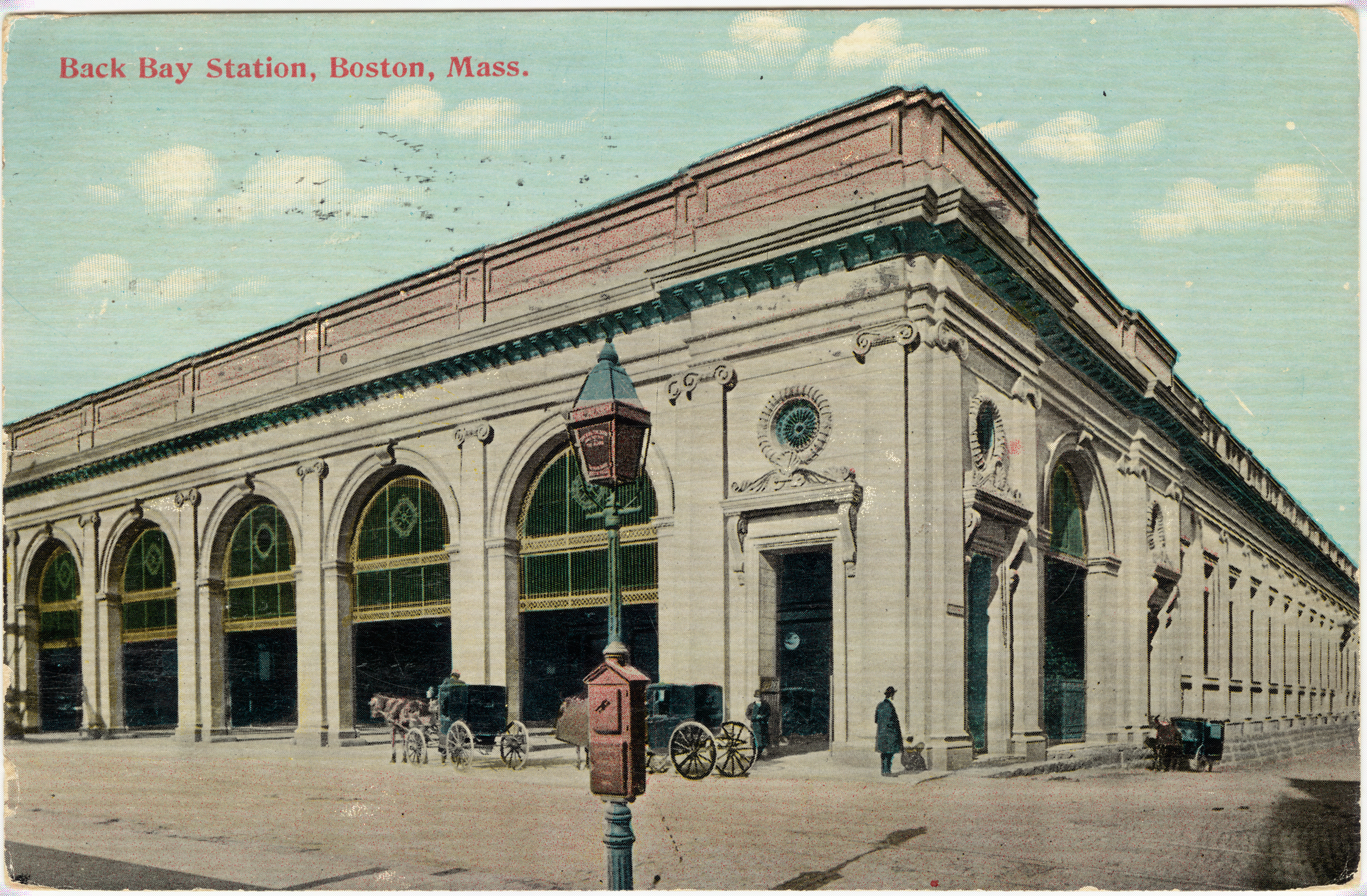
The 1899-built Back Bay station

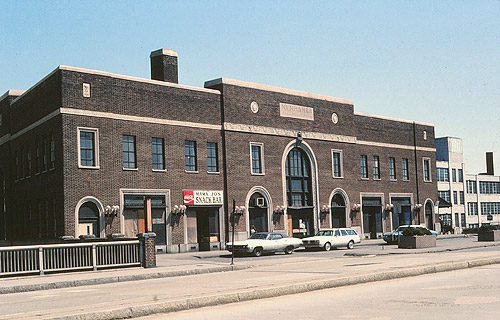
The 1929-built Back Bay station in 1980

=== Modern station ===
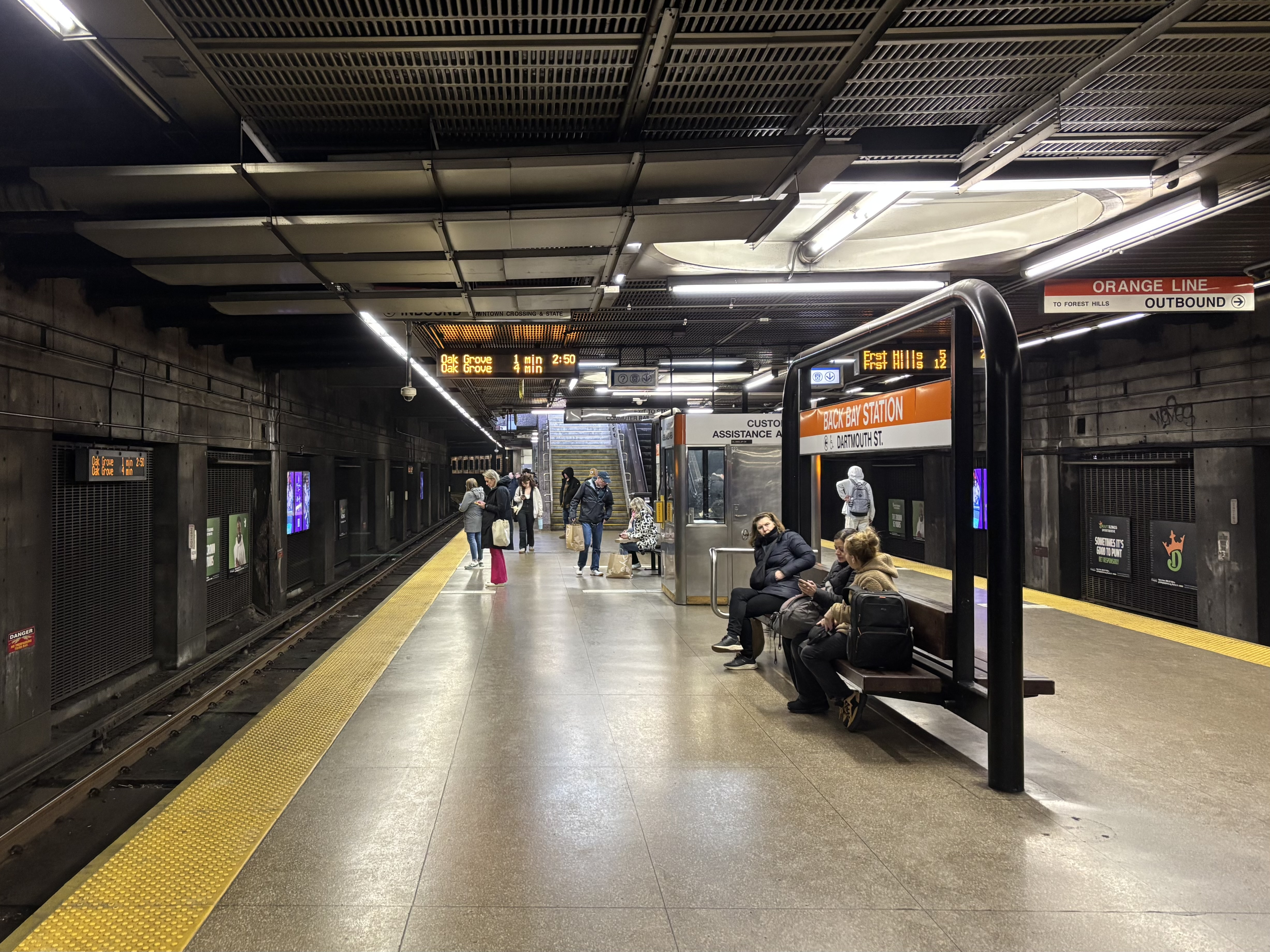
The Orange Line platform in 2025

The current Back Bay Station opened on May 4, 1987, as part of the Orange Line's Southwest Corridor project and was dedicated by Governor Michael Dukakis. It replaced the 1899-built and 1929-rebuilt ex-New York, New Haven and Hartford Railroad station of the same name, of which some remnants can still be found at the eastern end of the present station facilities, including a carved stone embedded in the brick wall on the east side of Columbus Avenue. The reopened station had South End as a secondary name, approved in 1985 as part of a series of station name changes.

The 1987 reconstruction added a waiting area with a 9-foot bronze statue dedicated to civil rights and labor movement pioneer A. Philip Randolph. The area includes various posters with historical photographs and interview excerpts regarding Randolph's career in organizing the Brotherhood of Sleeping Car Porters and work with the Civil Rights Movement.

In 1990, a northbound commuter train running along the Providence/Stoughton Line was involved in a collision with a northbound Night Owl train. The accident, which occurred at the west end of Back Bay, injured 453 people, although there were no fatalities.

On September 22, 2006, the MBTA began allowing free inbound travel from Back Bay to South Station. This change was to allow travel from Back Bay hotels to the Boston Convention and Exhibition Center and Logan International Airport (using the Silver Line from South Station) without the need to transfer to the Red Line. Until replaced with the CharlieCard Store at Downtown Crossing on August 13, 2012, an MBTA customer service booth for special pass users was located at Back Bay station. The entire Orange Line, including the Orange Line platform at Back Bay station, was closed from August 19 to September 18, 2022, during maintenance work. Amtrak and MBTA Commuter Rail service to the station was not changed.

=== Air quality ===
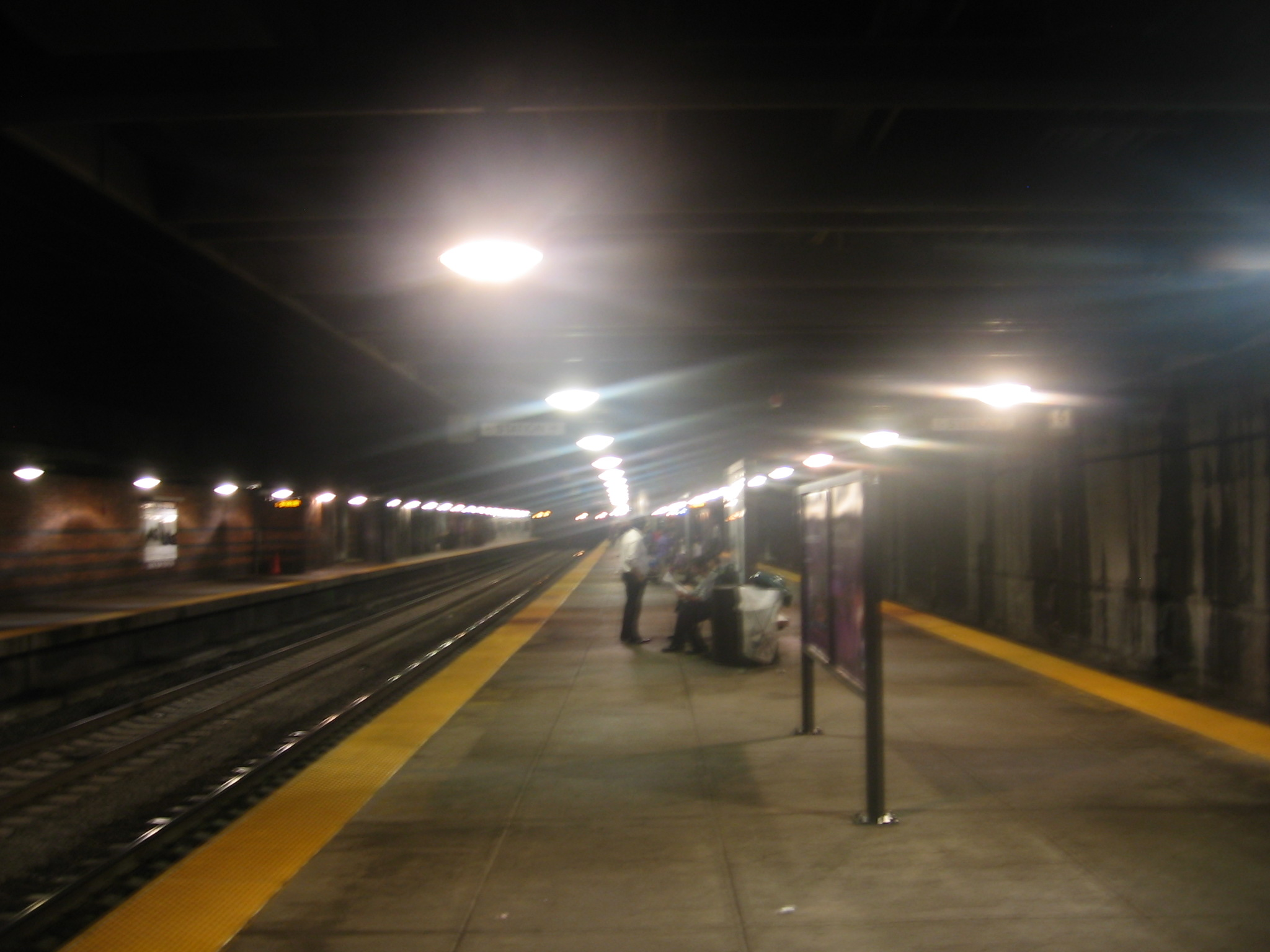
Northeast Corridor platforms at Back Bay in 2011; fumes in the air cause the halos around the ceiling lights

Back Bay station has suffered from poor air quality since its opening; passengers with lung conditions have been advised to avoid the station. Much of the commuter rail infrastructure at Back Bay is covered and enclosed, and so diesel fumes cannot escape quickly to the outside air. A petition drive in 2000 gathered complaints about the then-"longstanding" issue. Studies in 2006 and 2008 showed that "the air was many, many times below air-quality standards" due to trapped diesel exhaust and soot. An earlier study showed elevated levels of carbon monoxide, formaldehyde, particulates, and oxides of nitrogen, though it noted that there is no regulated standard to meet for indoor air quality in public spaces. Though simple changes were made regarding scheduling, and checking to make sure train engines were running properly, in 2008 the MBTA claimed it lacked the financial resources to fully upgrade the ventilation system.

In 2010, the MBTA secured $3.0 million in federal stimulus money to improve the ventilation in the lobby. The MBTA then planned to complete an improved ventilation system by 2012. On October 8, 2014, Amtrak removed its customer service and ticketing agents from the station due to the persistent air quality issues. Back Bay was to be an unstaffed station "until further notice". Amtrak personnel returned in 2015, but Amtrak pulled them again effective October 1, 2016.

The station has remained unstaffed since then. It remains one of the busiest Amtrak stations: in 2018, it was the fourth-busiest Amtrak station in New England (behind South Station, Providence and New Haven Union) and the 16th-busiest nationwide.

A $10 million ventilation project, funded equally by MassDOT and Boston Properties, was bid in 2016. The work was to improve ventilation at the platform level and add "air curtains" to prevent exhaust fumes from reaching the concourse. By 2019, final designs were due to be submitted in 2020, with the work expected to take until at least 2022. As of February 2025, the MBTA expects bidding for a $38 million construction contract to take place in April to June 2025.

=== Privatization and renovations ===
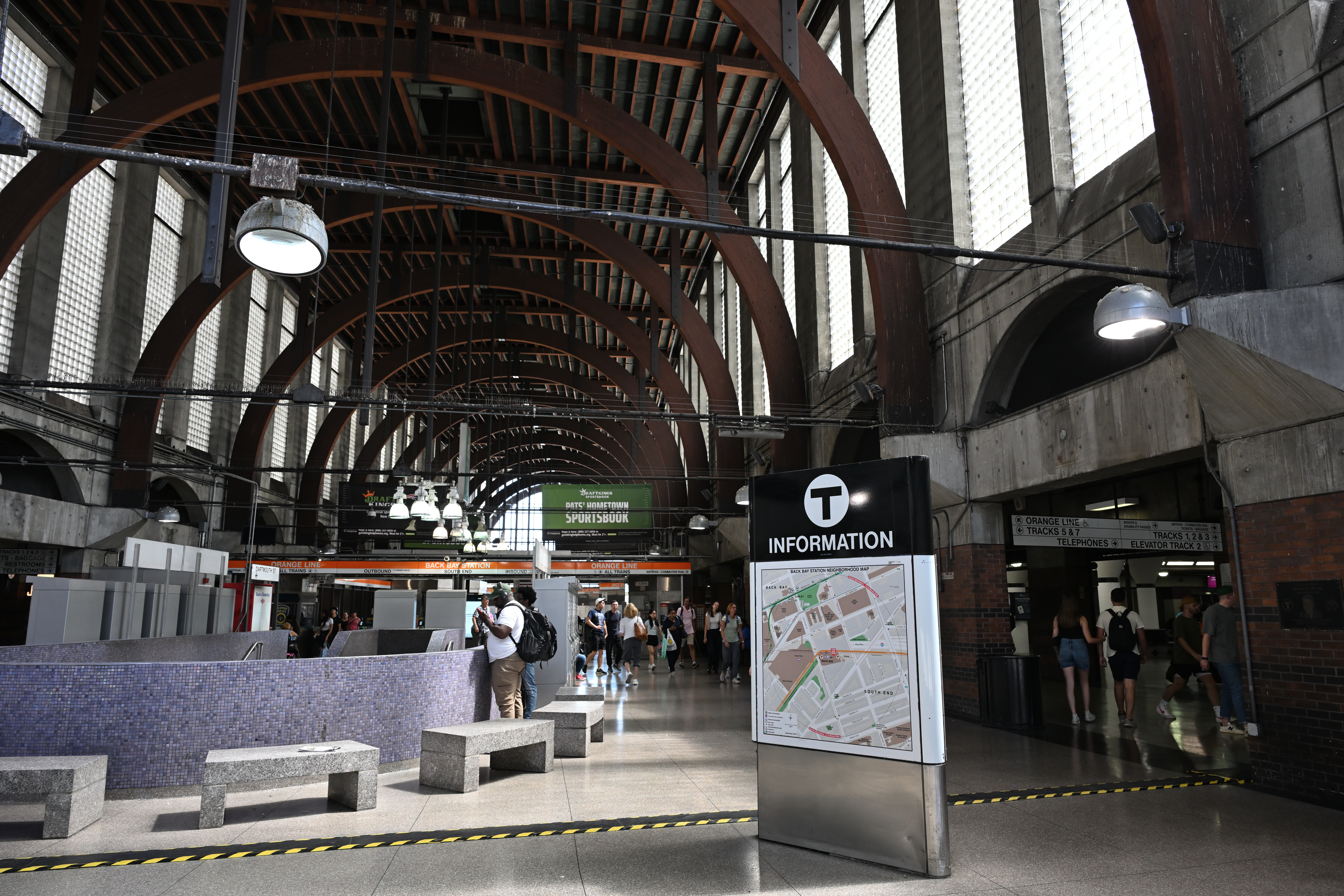
The station interior in 2024

Boston Properties (later BXP) purchased the adjacent parking garage in 2010. In 2014, the company began negotiating with the state for the right to build an air rights development atop the station and garage parcels, in exchange for managing the station and completing a $25 million renovation. Similar private management schemes were already in place at North Station and South Station, though without the real estate component. An agreement was signed in late 2014, with the renovation budget increased to $32 million. In August 2015, the MBTA began paying Boston Properties a subsidy (as rents from retail spaces had been lower than expected) and agreed to fund some repairs to expansion joints not covered in the original agreement.

Boston Properties filed notice with the Boston Redevelopment Authority (BRA) in December 2015, beginning the permitting process. Plans for the station and development were released in March 2016. The station renovation would include restoration of the original architecture, relocation of the Orange Line entrances, expanded waiting areas in the main concourse, renovated bathrooms, improved ventilation, and new retail spaces surrounding the concourse. The station work was then scheduled to begin in 2017 pending BRA approval. By 2019, construction was planned to begin in 2021. In 2024, BXP indicated that the tower project was on hold. As of June 2025, preliminary work for the station renovations is expected to last from June to November 2025, with construction from November 2025 to April 2027.

Back Bay was one of the ten high-ridership subway stations planned to receive new wayfinding signage, lighting, and other station improvements in 2019. Six of the stations were completed in 2019 and 2020; designs were completed for Back Bay and three others, but they were not constructed due to a lack of available funding. On September 26, 2021, nine people were injured when an escalator at the station malfunctioned. As of July 2026, the MBTA plans to install fare gates for the commuter rail and Amtrak platforms in early 2027.
