= Tina Allen =

American sculptor

- Allen and her statue of Frederick Douglass
- Born: Tina Powell; December 9, 1949; Hempstead, New York City
- Died: September 9, 2008 (aged 58); Los Angeles
- Education: University of South Alabama; School of Visual Arts; Pratt Institute
- Known for: Sculpture

Tina Allen (December 9, 1949 – September 9, 2008) was an American sculptor known for her monuments to prominent African Americans, including Frederick Douglass, Sojourner Truth, George Washington Carver, and A. Philip Randolph.

== Early life and education ==
Allen was born Tina Powell in Hempstead, New York in 1949 to father Gordon "Specs" Powell, a jazz drummer who played in the Ed Sullivan Show band, and Grenada-born Rosecleer Powell. Her mother was a writer and a nurse, and one of Allen's uncles was a sculptor. Allen began painting at 5 years old; by the time she was 10 she was setting up her easel to paint the seascape of Grenada, West Indies where she lived until her early teens. Allen's parents divorced when she was young. She lived with her mother for four years. While living with her mother in New York city, she met a sculptor by the name of William Zorach who later on became her mentor.

Allen was an artistic child who began sculpting at the age of 13, when she was assigned to make an ashtray and instead created a bust of Aristotle. She was mentored by the Lithuanian-American sculptor William Zorach who declared her a prodigy. She earned a bachelor of fine arts degree from the University of South Alabama in 1978. She also studied at the School of Visual Arts in Manhattan and received her Masters at the Pratt Institute.

People described her art as a history in bronze because she always focused on important black historical figures and wanted to portray them through sculpture. Allen often focused on the Harlem Renaissance. She also had periods of her work focus specifically on black men and then she turned her interest to black women.

After college she volunteered for AmeriCorps VISTA and for several years hosted a local television show on the arts in Mobile, Alabama.

== Career ==
Allen's first major work was a nine-foot bronze statue of A. Philip Randolph, leader of the Brotherhood of Sleeping Car Porters. Commissioned in 1986, the piece is displayed in Boston's Back Bay commuter train station and is featured on the Boston Women's Heritage Trail.

Over the next two decades Allen continued creating realistic sculptures of black activists for display in public spaces. Her work is also collected by museums, corporations and private collectors. Explaining her motivation, she said in an interview, "My work is not about me, it's about us." Not only does her work serve to emphasize the contributions and aspirations of the African Diaspora but also works to create a "visual landscape that is nurturing and life affirming to people of color" in celebrating the beauty of African Americans.

One of her best known works is a 13-foot bronze likeness of Alex Haley, which was installed in the Haley Heritage Square Park in Knoxville, Tennessee in 1998. Her statue of George Washington Carver is the focal point of the George Washington Carver Garden at the Missouri Botanical Gardens in St. Louis. Her 12-foot bronze monument to Sojourner Truth is displayed in Memorial Park Battle Creek, Michigan. Her bust of Frederick Douglass is on display at the Birmingham Civil Rights Institute; it was featured in a scene in the movie Akeelah and the Bee. She is part of the permanent collection at the Schomburg Center for Black Culture and the African-American museum in Long Island, New York. Allen also crafted a bronze medallion for the Women of Essence awards, which annually honor Black women of outstanding accomplishment and achievement. Other subjects include Ralph Bunche, Sammy Davis Jr., Charles R. Drew, Marcus Garvey, Martin Luther King Jr., Betty Shabazz, Tupac Shakur, Nat King Cole, James Baldwin, and Dorothy Dandridge.

== Personal life ==
Allen was married twice and had three children, Koryan, Josephine, and Tara. She died of a heart attack due to complications of pneumonia in Los Angeles on September 9, 2008.
