= Orange Line (MBTA) =

Rapid transit line in Greater Boston

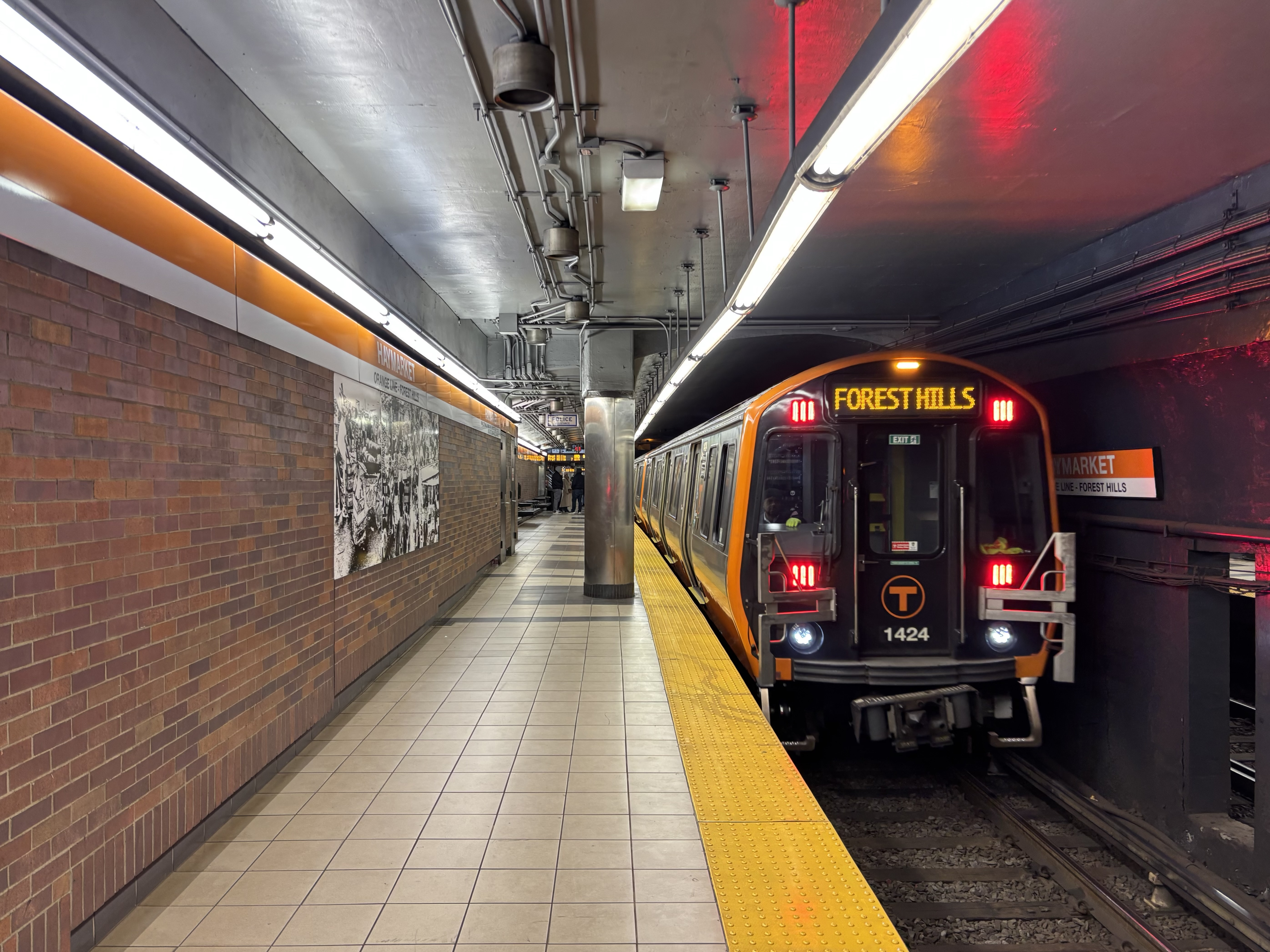
- A southbound Orange Line train at Haymarket station in 2025

Overview
- Locale: Greater Boston
- Termini: Oak Grove; Forest Hills
- Stations: 20

Service
- Type: Rapid transit
- System: MBTA subway
- Operator: Massachusetts Bay Transportation Authority
- Rolling stock: CRRC #14 Orange Line cars
- Daily ridership: 147,494 (July 2026)

History
- Opened: June 10, 1901

Technical
- Line length: 11 mi (18 km)
- Track gauge: 4 ft 8 1/2 in (1,435 mm) standard gauge
- Electrification: Third rail, 600 V DC
- Operating speed: 40–55 miles per hour (64–89 km/h)
Route map
- All stations are accessible

The Orange Line is a rapid transit line operated by the Massachusetts Bay Transportation Authority (MBTA) as part of the MBTA subway system. The line runs south on the surface from Oak Grove station in Malden, Massachusetts through Malden and Medford, paralleling the Haverhill Line, then crosses the Mystic River on a bridge into Somerville, then into Charlestown. It passes under the Charles River and runs through Downtown Boston in the Washington Street Tunnel. The line returns to the surface in the South End, then follows the Southwest Corridor southwest in a cut through Roxbury and Jamaica Plain to Forest Hills station.

The Orange Line operates during normal MBTA service hours (all times except late nights) with six-car trains. It uses a 152-car CRRC fleet built in 2018–2025. The Orange Line is fully grade-separated and trains are driven by operators with automatic train control for safety. Wellington Carhouse in Medford is used for heavy maintenance and storage; a small yard at Forest Hills is also used for storage. All 20 Orange Line stations are fully accessible. Averaging 147,494 weekday passengers in 2026, the Orange Line has the highest ridership of the MBTA subway lines.

The Orange Line originated as the Main Line Elevated of the Boston Elevated Railway, which was built in 1901. It consisted of the Charlestown Elevated, Atlantic Avenue Elevated, Washington Street Elevated, and a portion of the previously built Tremont Street subway. All of the original route has been replaced, beginning with the Washington Street Tunnel replacing the Tremont Street subway in 1908. The Washington Street Elevated was extended from Dudley Square to Forest Hills in 1909, with an infill station at Green Street in 1912; the Charlestown Elevated was extended from Sullivan Square to Everett in 1919. The Atlantic Avenue Elevated was closed in 1938.

The newly formed MBTA assigned colors to its subway lines in 1965, with the Main Line becoming the Orange Line. The Charlestown Elevated was closed in 1975; it was replaced by the Haymarket North Extension, which opened in phases from 1975 to 1977. The Southwest Corridor replaced the Washington Street Elevated in 1987, using an alignment originally intended for Interstate 95, completing the modern Orange Line alignment. The downtown stations were lengthened in the 1980s to allow six-car trains. Accessibility modifications began with some of those stations and were completed in 2005. Assembly opened as an infill station in 2014.

The Orange Line struggled with reliability issues, including aging infrastructure and trains, throughout the 2010s and into the 2020s. Several prominent incidents occurred in 2022 alone, despite the then-underway fleet replacement. Accelerated repairs took place across the entire Orange Line from August 19 to September 18, 2022, and again across different segments of the line throughout 2024.

== History ==
=== Construction ===
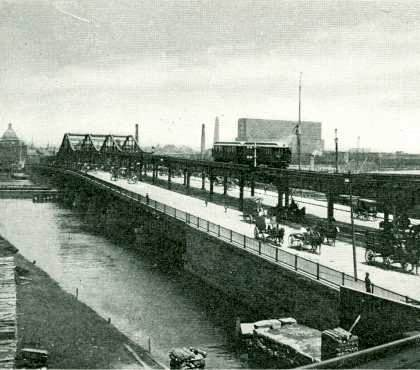
The Charlestown El running over the Charlestown Bridge

The Main Line of the electric Boston Elevated Railway opened in segments, starting in 1901. It proceeded from Sullivan Square along the Charlestown Elevated to the Canal Street incline near North Station. It was carried underground by the Tremont Street subway (now part of the Green Line), returning above ground at the Pleasant Street incline (now closed, located just south of Boylston station). A temporary link connected from there to the Washington Street Elevated, which in 1901 ran from this point via Washington Street to Dudley Square (which is most of what is now Phase 1 of the Silver Line).

Also in 1901, the Atlantic Avenue Elevated opened, branching at Causeway Street to provide an alternate route through downtown Boston (along the shoreline, where today there is no rail transit) to the Washington Street Elevated.

In 1908, a new Washington Street Tunnel opened, allowing Main Line service to travel from the Charlestown Elevated, underground via an additional new portal at the Canal Street incline, under downtown Boston and back up again to meet the Washington Street Elevated and Atlantic Avenue Elevated near Chinatown. The stations were richly decorated with tile work, mosaics, and copper; after criticism of the large Tremont Street subway headhouses, most entrances were comparatively modest and set into buildings. Use of the parallel Tremont Street subway was returned exclusively to streetcars.

By 1909, the Washington Street Elevated had been extended south to Forest Hills. Trains from Washington Street were routed through the new subway, either all the way to Sullivan Square, or back around in a loop via the subway and then the Atlantic Avenue Elevated.

In 1919, the same year that the Atlantic Avenue Elevated was partially damaged in Boston's Great Molasses Flood, the Charlestown Elevated was extended north from Sullivan Square to Everett station, over surface right-of-way parallel to Alford Street/Broadway, with a drawbridge over the Mystic River. The Boston Elevated had long-term plans to continue this extension further north to Malden, a goal which would only be achieved decades later, under public ownership and not via the Everett route.

=== Closure of Atlantic Avenue Elevated and ownership changes ===
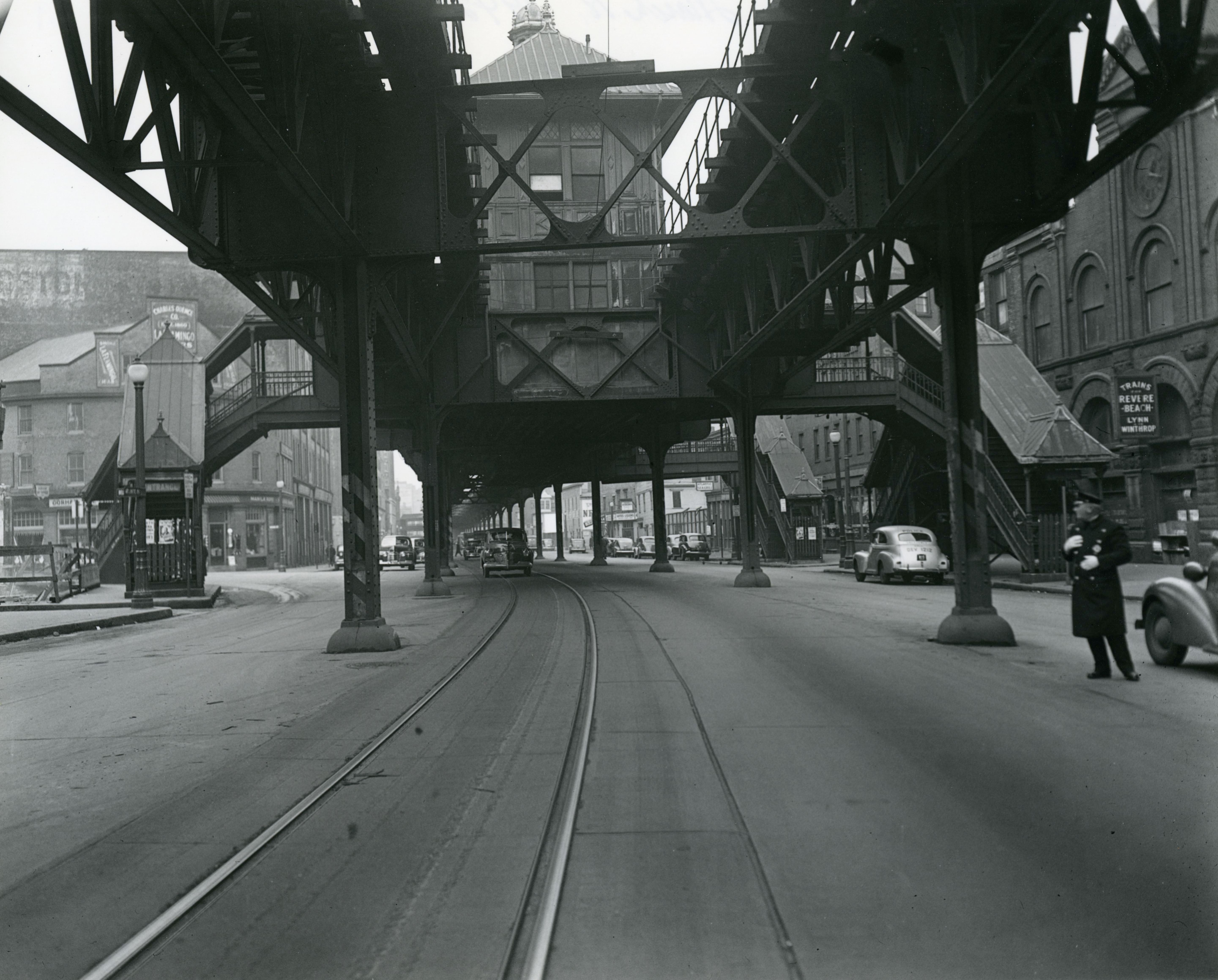
Rowes Wharf station on the Atlantic Avenue Elevated in 1942 – four years after closure – just before being demolished

Following a 1928 accident at a tight curve on Beach Street, the southern portion of the Atlantic Avenue Elevated, between South Station and Tower D on Washington Street, was closed (except for rush-hour trips from Dudley to North Station via the Elevated), breaking the loop; non-rush-hour Atlantic Avenue service was reduced to a shuttle between North and South Stations. In 1938, the remainder of the Atlantic Avenue Elevated was closed, leaving the subway as the only route through downtown – what is now the Orange Line between Haymarket and Chinatown stations.

Ownership of the railway was transferred from the private Boston Elevated Railway to the public Metropolitan Transit Authority (MTA) in 1947; the MTA was itself reconstituted as the modern Massachusetts Bay Transportation Authority (MBTA) in 1964.

On December 5, 1960, the MTA began operating "modified express service" on the line during the morning rush hour. Every other train bypassed Green Street, Egleston (southbound) or Northampton (northbound), Dover, and Thompson Square stations. This was discontinued in September 1961 to reduce wait times at the skipped stations, all of which were outdoors.

=== Orange Line naming ===
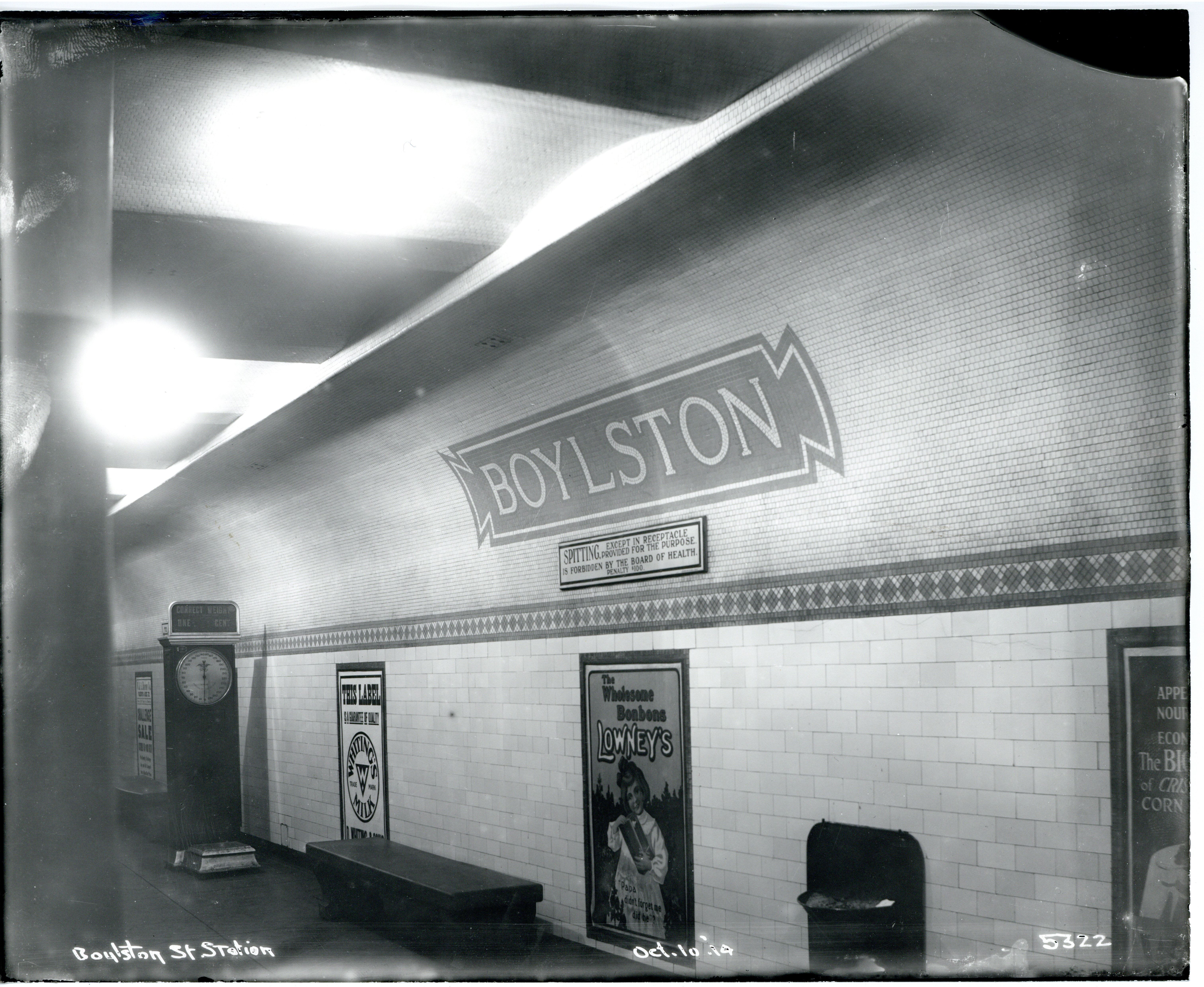
Station sign at Boylston Street (now Chinatown) station in 1914. In 1967, the station was renamed Essex to avoid confusion with the preexisting Green Line station a block away.

The line was known as the Main Line Elevated under the Boston Elevated Railway, and the Forest Hills–Everett Elevated (Route 2 on maps) under the Metropolitan Transportation Authority.

After taking over operations in August 1964, the MBTA began rebranding many elements of Boston's public transportation network. Colors were assigned to the rail lines on August 26, 1965, as part of a wider modernization developed by Cambridge Seven Associates. Peter Chermayeff assigned red, green, and blue to the other three lines based on geographic features; however, according to Chermayeff, the Main Line El "ended up being orange for no particular reason beyond color balance." The firm originally planned for yellow instead of orange, but yellow was rejected after testing because yellow text was difficult to read on a white background. (Yellow was later used for MBTA bus service). The MBTA and transit historians later claimed that orange came from Orange Street, an early name for what is now part of Washington Street.

In January and February 1967, the four original Washington Street Tunnel stations were renamed. Transfer stations were given the same name for all lines: Winter and Summer stations plus Washington on the Red Line became Washington, Milk and State plus Devonshire on the Blue Line became State Street after the cross street, and Union and Friend plus Haymarket Square on the Green Line became Haymarket after Haymarket Square. Boylston Street was renamed Essex to avoid confusion with nearby Boylston station on the Green Line.

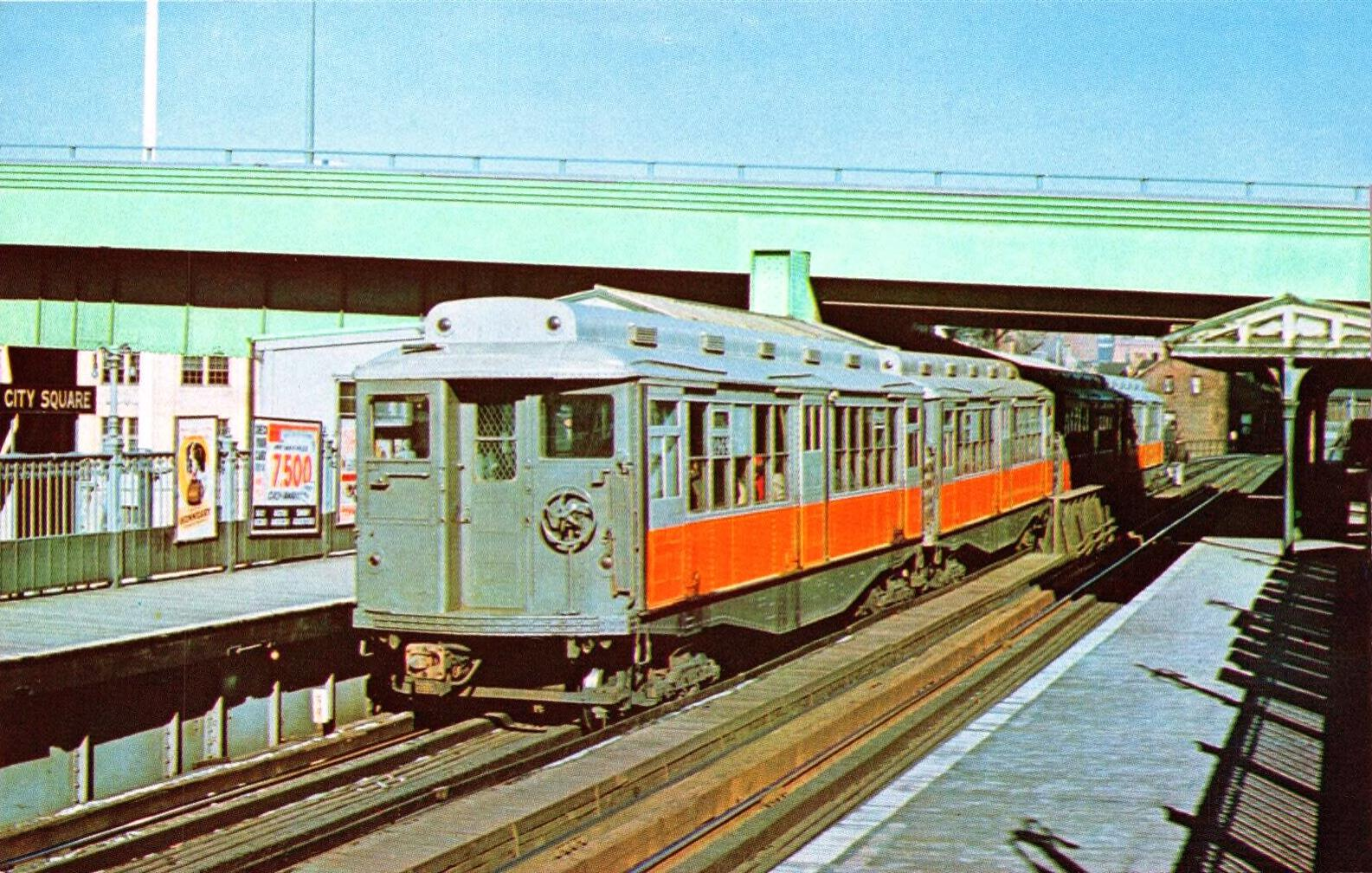
A train at City Square station in 1958

In May 1987, Essex was renamed Chinatown after the adjacent Chinatown neighborhood, and Washington renamed Downtown Crossing after the adjacent shopping district. In March 2010, New England Medical Center station was renamed as Tufts Medical Center two years after the eponymous hospital changed its name.

=== Rerouting of Charlestown and Everett service ===
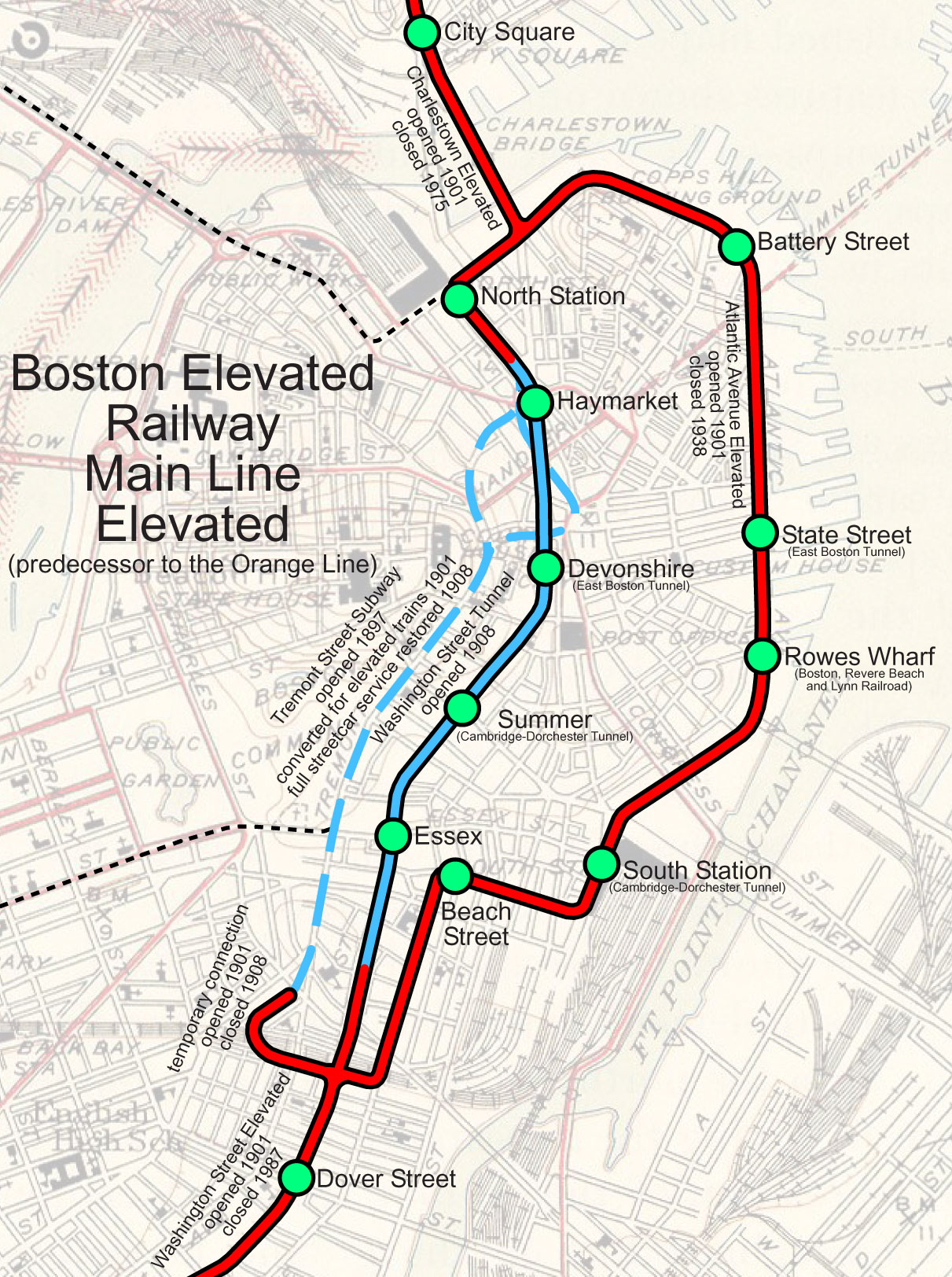
Map of the original Main Line Elevated and related lines

The Boston Transportation Planning Review looked at the line in the 1970s, considering extensions to reach the Route 128 beltway, with termini at Reading in the north and Dedham in the south. As a result of this review, the Charlestown Elevated – which served the Charlestown neighborhood north of downtown Boston and the inner suburb of Everett – was demolished and replaced in 1975.

The Haymarket North Extension rerouted the Orange Line through an underwater crossing of the Charles River. Service in Charlestown was replaced with service along Boston and Maine tracks routed partially beneath an elevated section of Interstate 93, ultimately to Wellington and then to Oak Grove in Malden, Massachusetts, instead of Everett. Rail service to Everett was replaced with buses.

The extension was unique among Boston transit lines as it contained a third express track between Wellington and Community College stations. These stations, along with Sullivan Sq, have two island platform stations as opposed to the more normal single island stations found on the southern side of the Orange Line. This express track was designed for the never-built extension north of Oak Grove to Reading. The third track would have allowed peak-direction express service as well as places to terminate trains. Service north of Oak Grove was planned to have longer headways to account for the lower projected ridership. This extension was opposed by residents of Melrose who preferred restored commuter rail service. Because of this, the express track ends at Wellington and a single commuter rail track continues parallel to the Orange Line north to Reading.

=== Closure of Washington Street Elevated ===
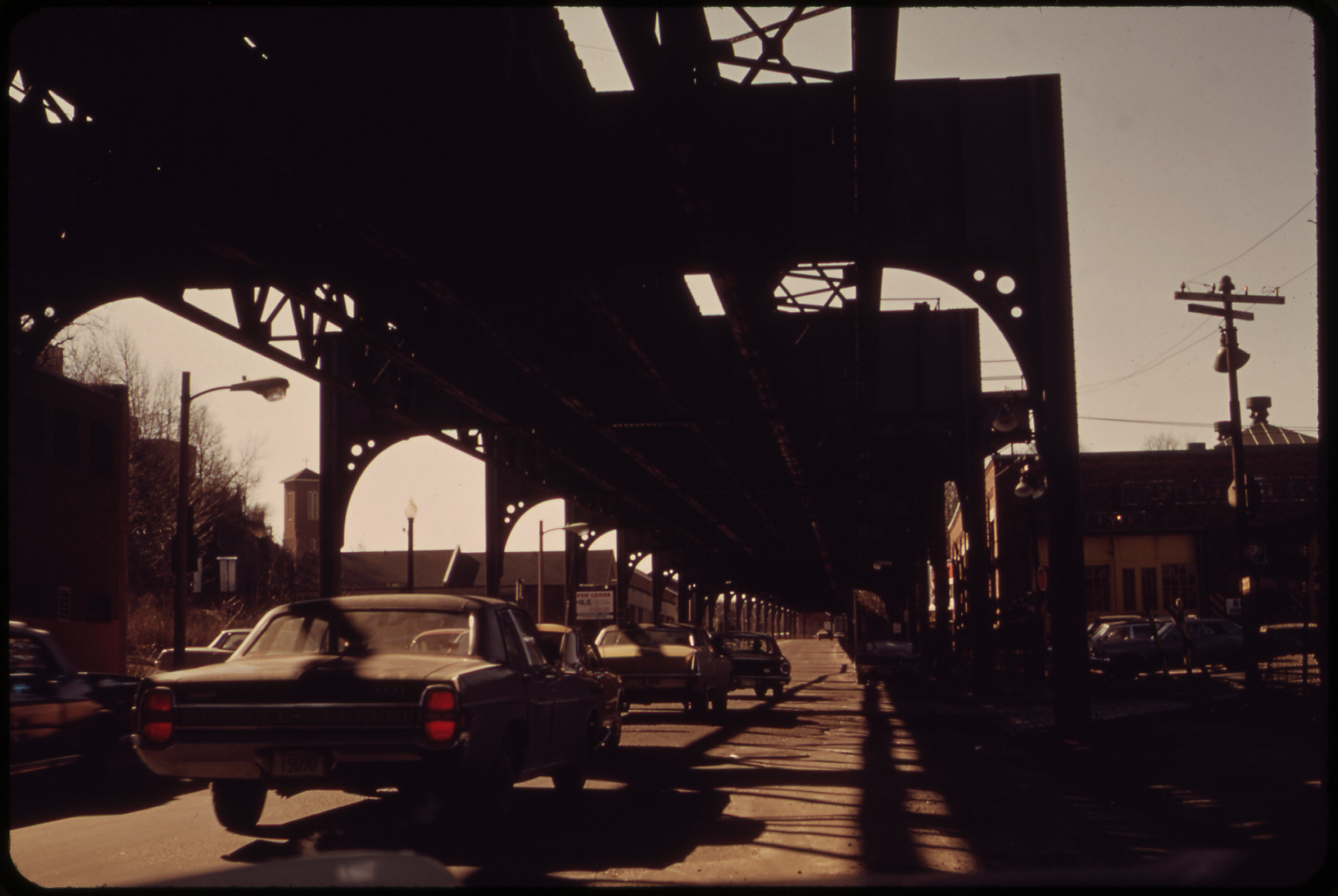
View under Washington Street Elevated, looking south from Bartlett Street (1973)

Construction of Interstate 95 into downtown Boston was cancelled in 1972 after local protest over the attendant demolition of homes and businesses for the I-95 right-of-way. However, land for I-95's Southwest Corridor through Roxbury had already been cleared of buildings; moreover, the state had already committed to using this vacant land for transportation purposes. As a result, instead of an 8-lane Interstate highway with a relocated Orange Line running in its median (in a manner similar to the Chicago Transit Authority's Dan Ryan, Congress, and O'Hare branches), the space would be occupied by the realigned Orange Line, a reconstructed three-track mainline for Amtrak's Northeast Corridor and MBTA Commuter Rail trains, and a linear park. After this re-routing was accomplished in 1987, the Washington Street Elevated was torn down, the last major segment of the original elevated line to be demolished.

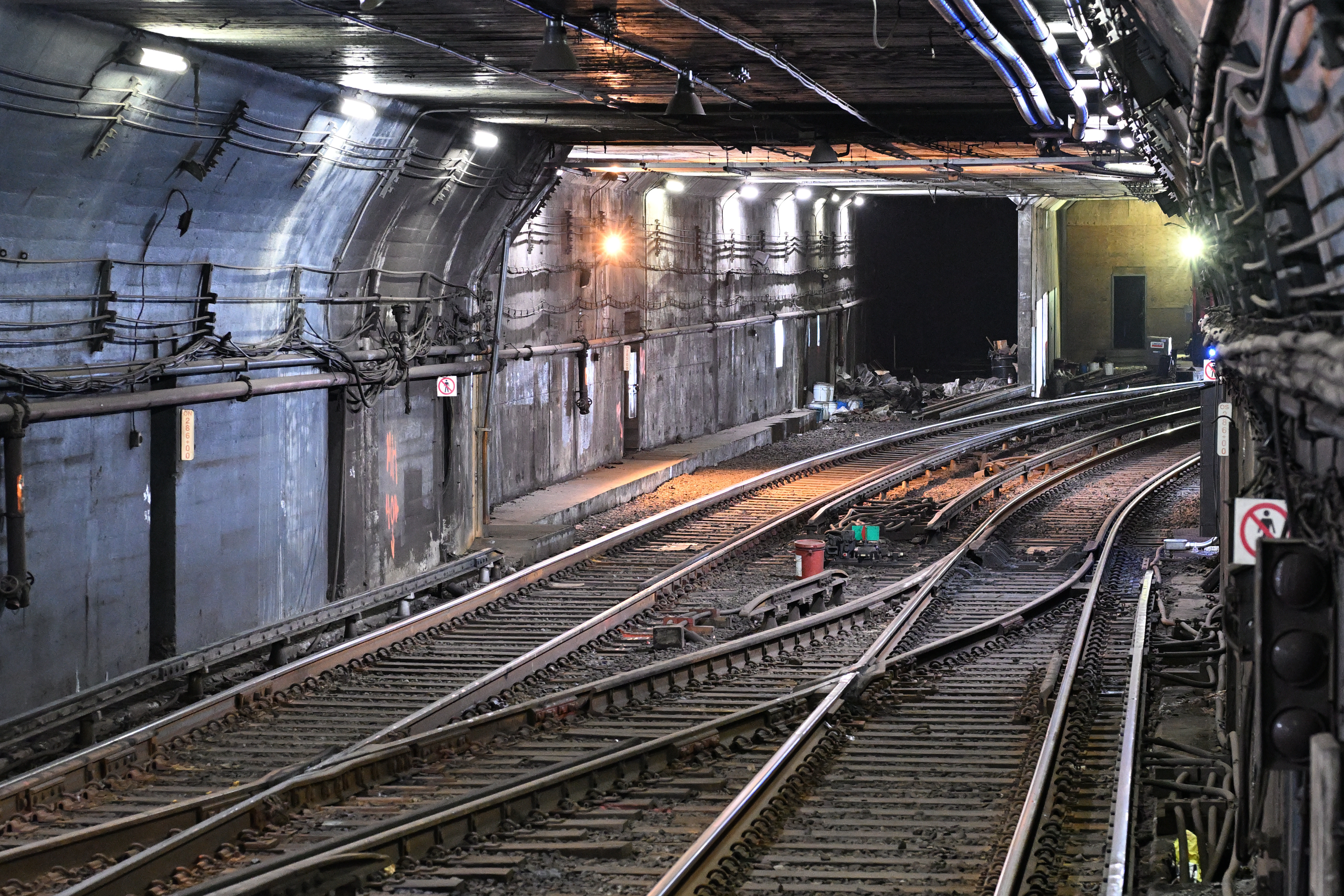
The modern view from the platform at Chinatown shows the remains of the Washington Street Tunnel that led to the Elevated in the distance. In the foreground, the tracks curve rightward into the Southwest Corridor.

Between April 30 and May 3, 1987, the Washington Street Elevated south of the Chinatown station was closed to allow the Orange Line to be tied into the new Southwest Corridor. On May 4, 1987, the Orange Line was rerouted from the southern end of the Washington Street Tunnel onto the new Southwest Corridor. Instead of rising up to elevated tracks, it now veered west at the Massachusetts Turnpike and followed the Pike and the old Boston and Albany Railroad right-of-way to the existing MBTA Commuter Rail stop at Back Bay. It then continued along new tracks, partially covered and partially open but depressed, to Forest Hills. This MBTA right-of-way is also shared by Amtrak as part of the national Northeast Corridor intercity passenger rail service.

External videos
- Orange Line El Stations, 11:42, April 30, 1987, Boston TV Digital News

While ending more or less at the same terminus (Forest Hills), the new routing passes significantly to the west of its previous route on Washington Street; local residents were promised "equal or better" replacement service. Originally, plans provided for light rail vehicles street running in mixed traffic, from Washington Street to Dudley Square, then diverting southeastward on Warren Street towards Dorchester. In 2002, Phase 1 of the Silver Line bus rapid transit was added to connect Washington Street to the downtown subways, attempting to address this service need. This replacement service was controversial, as many residents preferred the return of rail transportation.

=== Station renovations ===
In the mid-1980s, the MBTA spent $80 million to extend the platforms of seven Red Line and three Orange Line stations (Essex, Washington, and State) to allow the use of six-car trains. Washington and State were made fully accessible, as was the northbound platform at Essex. The Southwest Corridor stations opened in 1987 were all fully accessible. Six-car trains entered service on August 18, 1987. Oak Grove was also renovated around 1987.

This left only Haymarket, five stations on the Haymarket North Extension, and the southbound platform at Chinatown inaccessible by the 1990 passage of the Americans with Disabilities Act. Construction at Sullivan Square and Wellington began in 1991. Haymarket was retrofitted with elevators in 2000. The 1975-built North Station was expanded into a "superstation" with a cross-platform transfer to the Green Line; elevators were in installed in 2001, though the Green Line did not use the station until 2004. The southbound platform at Chinatown was made accessible in 2002. Renovations to Community College and Malden Center were completed in 2005, making the Orange Line the first of the four original MBTA subway lines to become fully accessible.

=== Assembly ===
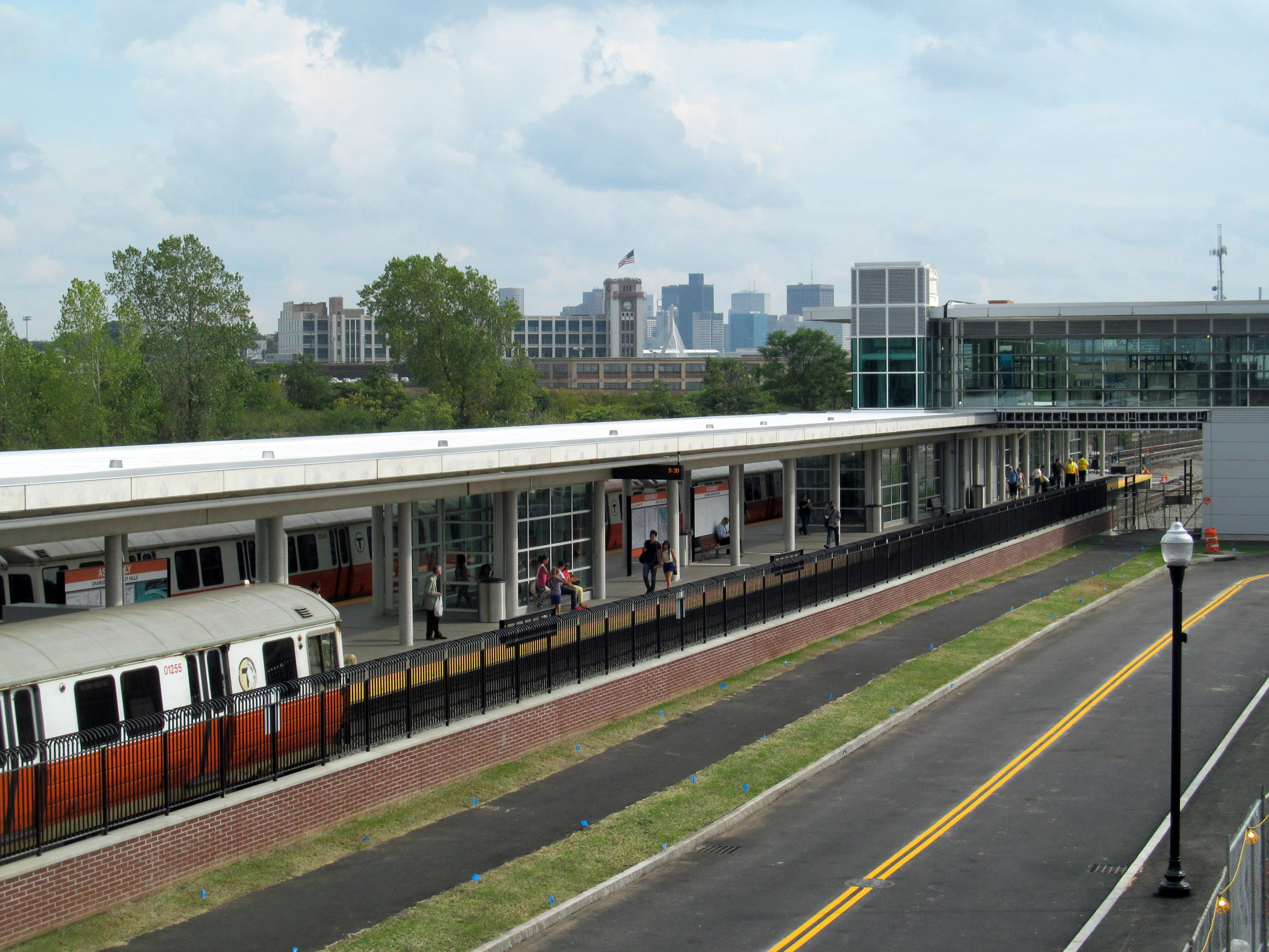
Assembly station on its first day of service in September 2014

In the early 2000s, Somerville began planning an infill station between Sullivan and Wellington to serve the new Assembly Square development. The $57 million station was funded by the state's Executive Office of Housing and Economic Development, FTA Section 5309 New Starts program, and Federal Realty Investment Trust (the developer of Assembly Square). Construction began in late 2011 and finished in mid 2014. The new station, Assembly, opened on September 2, 2014. It was the first new station on the MBTA subway system since 1987.

=== Reliability issues and repairs ===
During the unusually brutal winter of 2014–2015, the entire MBTA system was shut down on several occasions by heavy snowfalls. The aboveground sections of the Orange and Red lines were particularly vulnerable due to their exposed third rail, which iced over during storms. When a single train stopped due to power loss, other trains soon stopped as well; without continually running trains pushing snow off the rails, the lines were quickly covered in snow. (Because the Blue Line was built with overhead lines on its surface section due to its proximity to corrosive salt air, it was not subject to icing issues.)

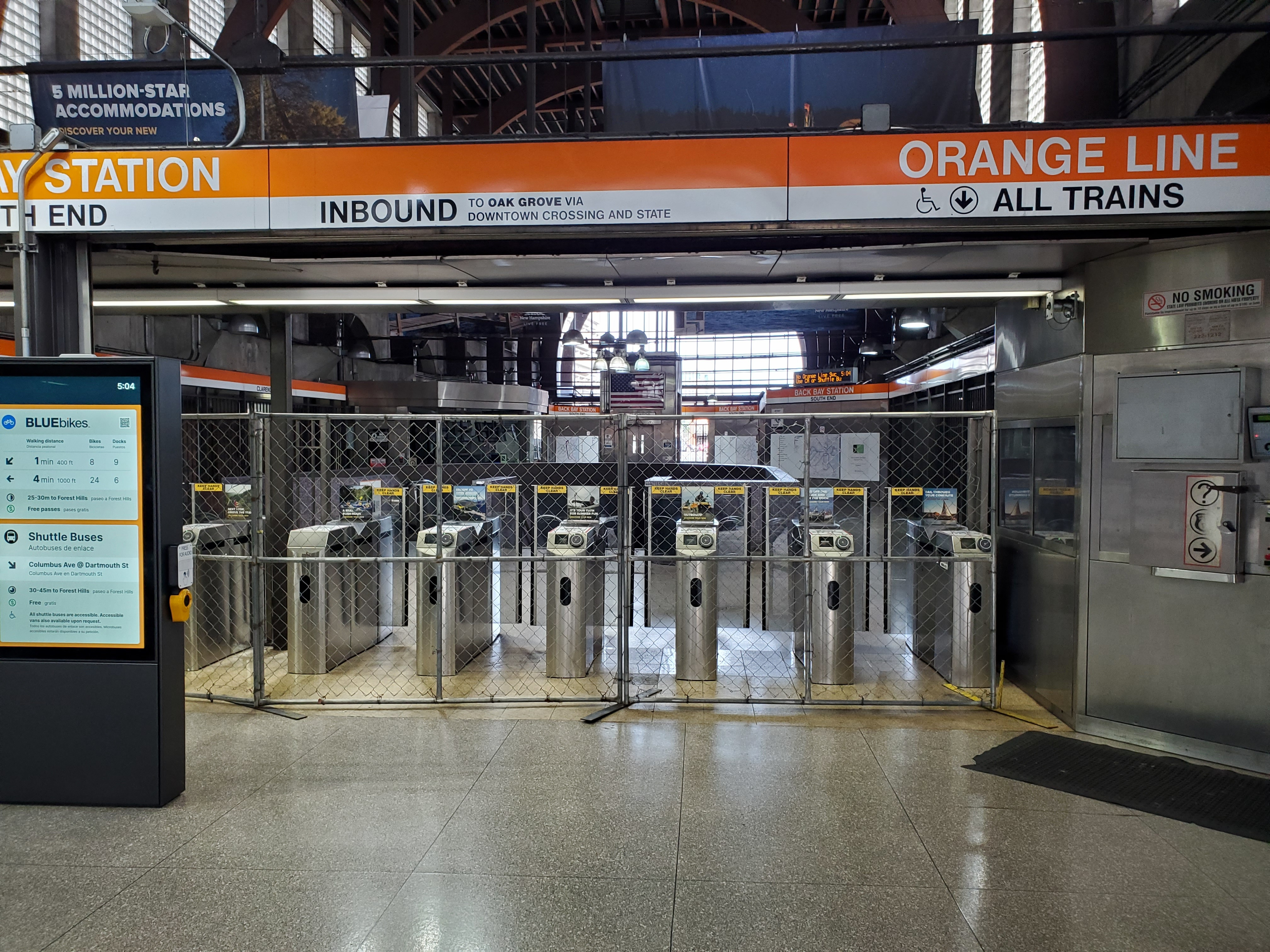
Fenced-off faregates at Back Bay during the August–September 2022 closure

Starting in 2015, the MBTA began implementing its $83.7 million Winter Resiliency Program, much of which focused on preventing similar issues with the Orange and Red lines. The Southwest Corridor section of the Orange Line is located in a trench and is protected from the worst weather, but the 1970s-built Haymarket North Extension had older infrastructure and was in worse shape. From Sullivan Square north, it is exposed to the weather and largely built on an embankment, rendering it more vulnerable. That section received new heated third rail, switch heaters, and snow fences to reduce the impacts of inclement weather. The work required bustitution of the line from Sullivan Square to Oak Grove on certain weeknights and weekends.

In October 2018, the MBTA awarded a $218 million signal contract for the Red and Orange Lines, which was planned to allow 4.5-minute headways on the Orange Line beginning in 2022.

On July 22, 2022, an Orange Line train caught fire while crossing the Mystic River. A metal sill along the underside of the train came loose and came into contact with the third rail, igniting sparks. Passengers had to jump out of the train onto the tracks, and one woman jumped into the river below and swam to shore. There were no injuries or casualties.

Following various reliability issues on the Orange Line, the MBTA announced that it would close the entire line for renovations from August 19 to September 18, 2022. During the closure, the MBTA conducted accelerated repairs to track, ties, signals, and concrete walls, as well as replacing two crossovers. This was intended to remove speed restrictions and improve safety and reliability. The shutdown also gave time for more new CRRC cars to be delivered and put into service; after the closure, service on the line resumed with new trains almost all the time. However, the work was not enough to eliminate all slow zones, and temporary slow zones were added where work was performed. By early October, a round trip on the full line was 13 minutes slower than before the shutdown, and 20 minutes slower than it would be without any slow zones. On October 25, the MBTA sent a letter to Senator Ed Markey, who had been investigating the project, detailing work needed during November and December to lift remaining slow zones, ranging from always-planned to unexpectedly necessary tasks.

In early November 2023, MBTA General Manager Phillip Eng announced a plan to eliminate all 191 slow zones across the MBTA subway system by the end of 2024. Under this plan, the first of several intermittent shutdowns of different segments of the Orange Line began on March 18, 2024, with more shutdowns taking place that June and October. All slow zones on the Orange Line were finally removed by early November 2024. Maximum speeds were restored from 45 miles per hour (72 km/h) to 55 miles per hour (89 km/h) north of Assembly station on August 24, 2025, and between North Station and Assembly station on October 18, 2026. 55 mph was the original speed of the Haymarket North Extension, but the limit was lowered over time as the infrastructure was neglected.

=== Historical routes ===
Route diagram templates of the various Orange Line routes over its history

1901–1908
1908–1938

1938–1975
1975–1987

1987–present
Notes

- Haymarket and State got their modern names in 1967. Downtown Crossing and Chinatown also changed names in 1967, but changed again in 1987.
- New England Medical Center was renamed Tufts Medical Center in 2010.

== Station listing ==
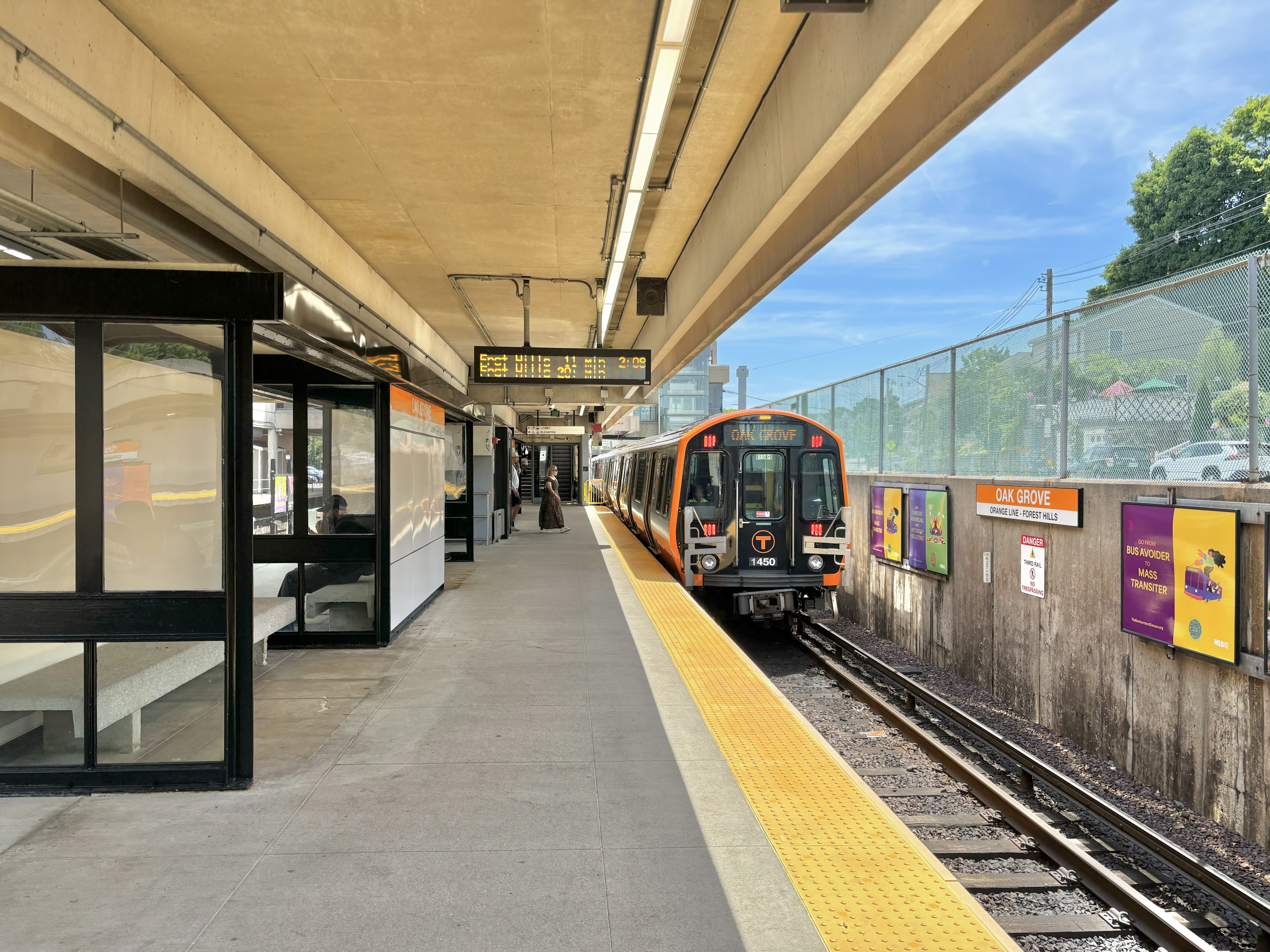
A train arriving at Oak Grove station, the line's northern terminus

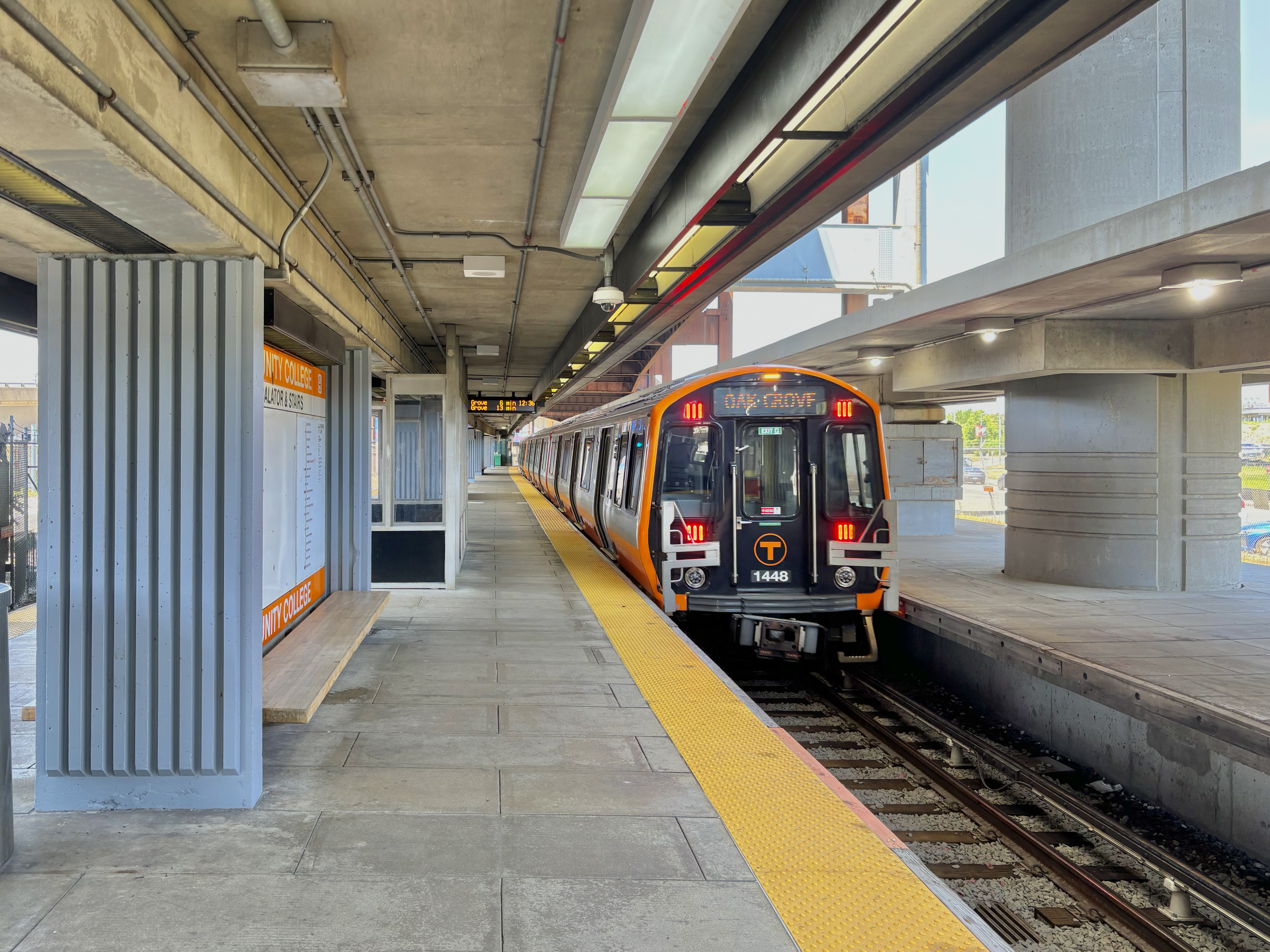
A northbound train departing Community College station

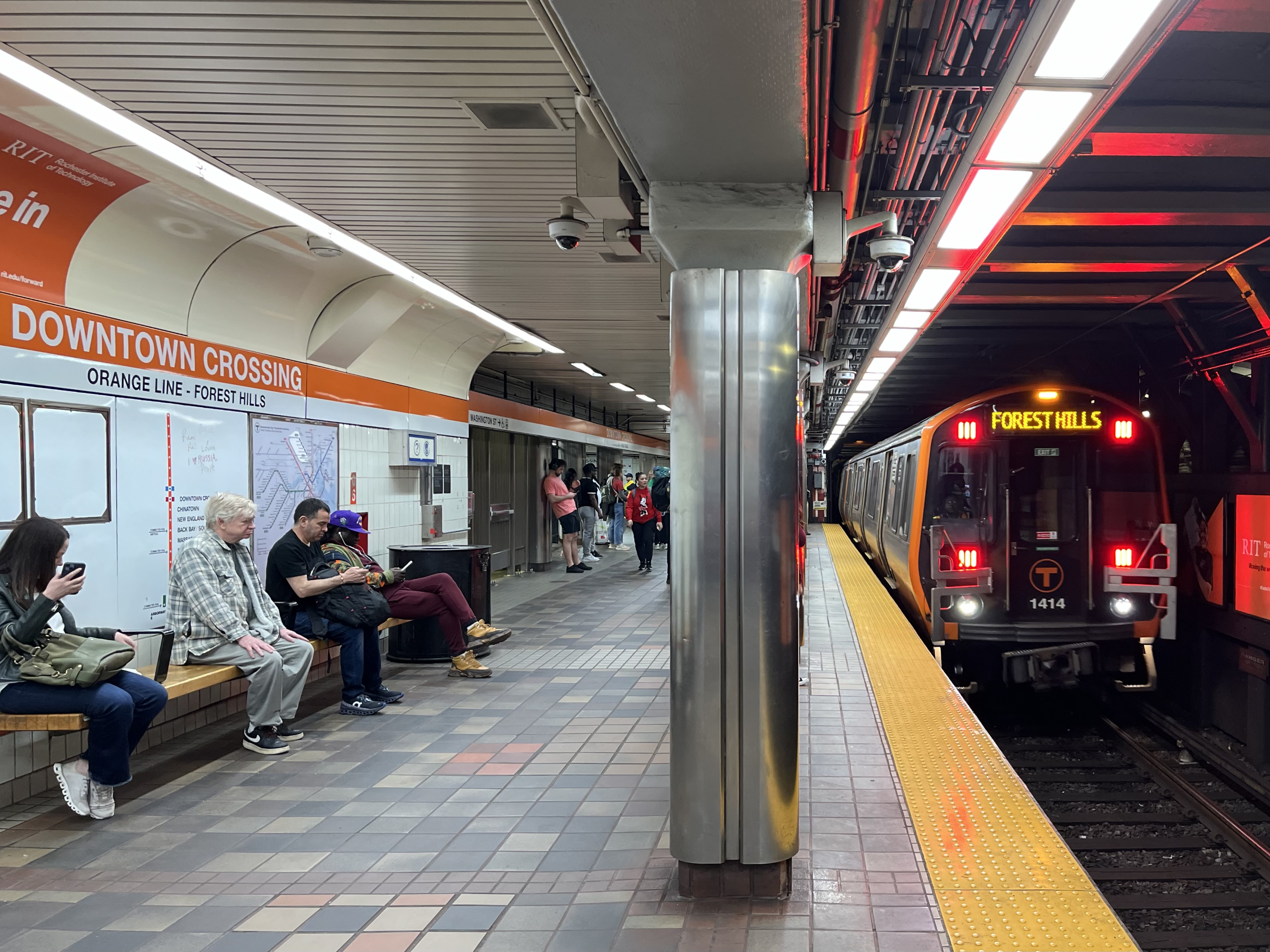
A southbound train arriving at Downtown Crossing station

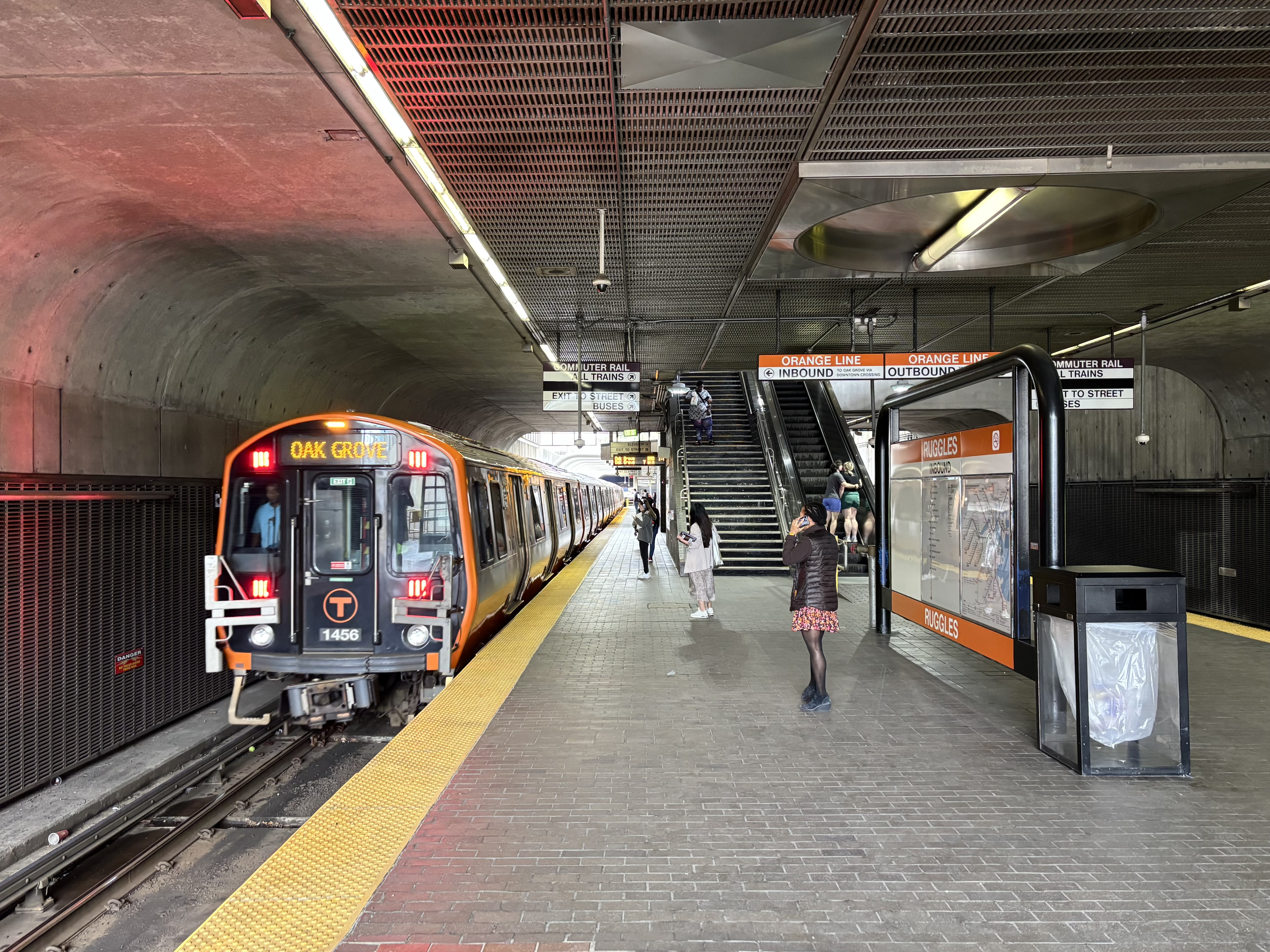
A northbound train arriving at Ruggles station

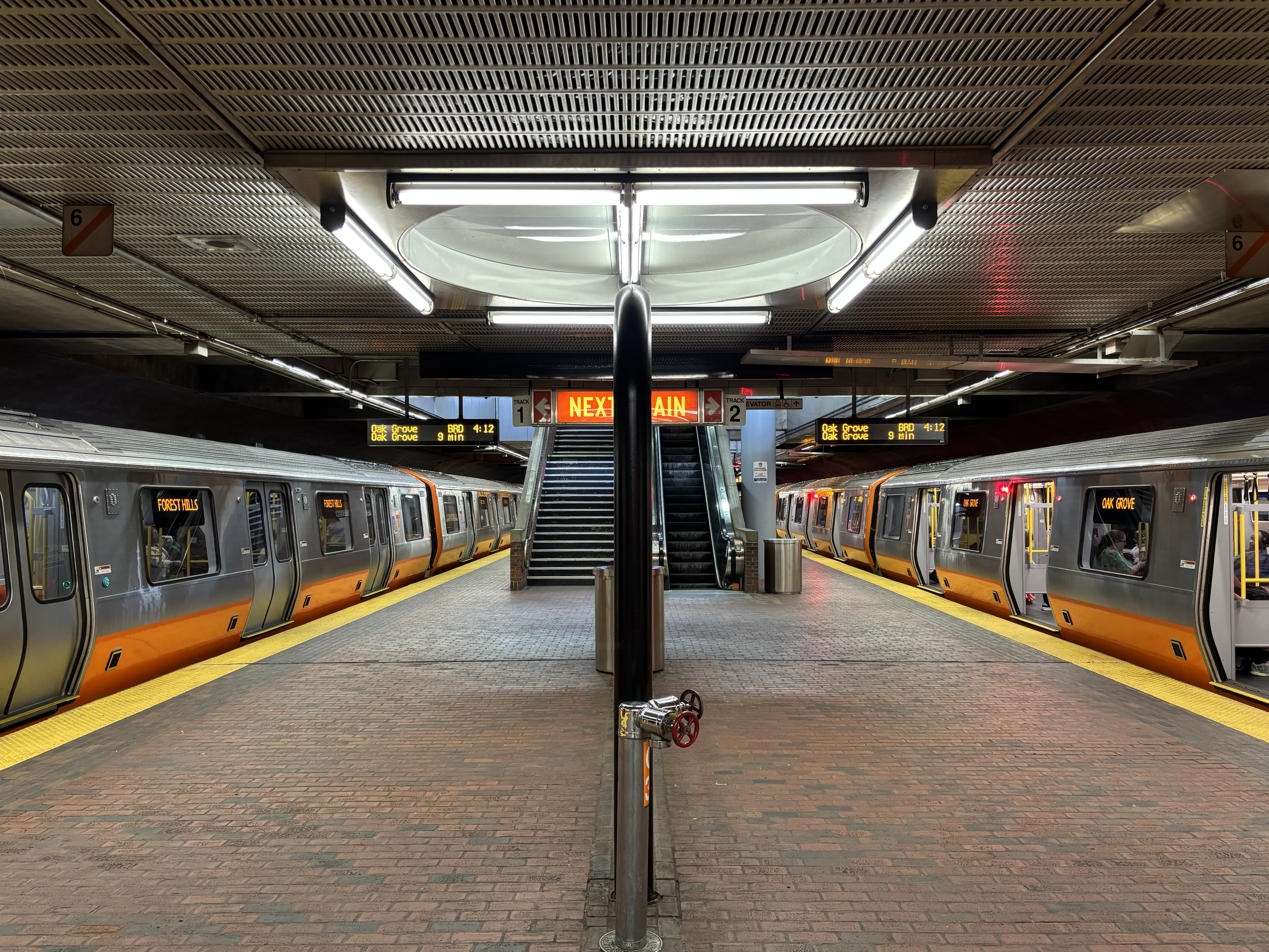
Two trains at Forest Hills station, the line's southern terminus

Location	Station	Opened	Notes and connections
Malden	Oak Grove	March 19, 1977	MBTA Commuter Rail: Haverhill; MBTA bus: 131, 132, 137
Malden	Malden Center	December 27, 1975	MBTA Commuter Rail: Haverhill; MBTA bus: 97, 99, 101, 104, 105, 106, 108, 131, 132, 137, 411, 430
Medford	Wellington	September 6, 1975	MBTA bus: 97, 99, 100, 106, 108, 110, 112, 134
Somerville	Assembly	September 2, 2014	
Charlestown, Boston	Sullivan Square	April 7, 1975	Original elevated station was open from June 10, 1901, to April 4, 1975. MBTA bus: 85, 89, 90, 91, 92, 93, 95, 101, 105, 109; Lower Mystic Link
Charlestown, Boston	Community College	April 7, 1975	
North End, Boston	North Station	April 7, 1975	Original elevated station was open from June 10, 1901, to April 4, 1975. MBTA subway: Green Line (D, E); MBTA Commuter Rail: Fitchburg, Lowell, Haverhill, Newburyport/Rockport; MBTA bus: 4 Amtrak: Downeaster; EZRide; MBTA ferry: F10 (at Lovejoy Wharf); Seaport Ferry (at Lovejoy Wharf)
North End, Boston	Haymarket	November 30, 1908	MBTA subway: Green Line (D, E); MBTA bus: 4, 92, 93, 111, 354, 426, 428, 450
Downtown Boston	State	November 30, 1908	MBTA subway: Blue Line; MBTA bus: 4, 92, 93, 354
Downtown Boston	Downtown Crossing	November 30, 1908	MBTA subway: Red Line Silver Line (SL5); MBTA bus: 7, 11, 501, 504, 505; At Park Street: Green Line (B, C, D, E); 43
Chinatown, Boston	Chinatown	November 30, 1908	MBTA subway: Silver Line (SL4, SL5); MBTA bus: 11
Chinatown, Boston	Tufts Medical Center	May 4, 1987	MBTA subway: Silver Line (SL4, SL5); MBTA bus: 11, 43
Back Bay, Boston	Back Bay	May 4, 1987	MBTA Commuter Rail: Framingham/Worcester, Franklin/Foxboro, Needham, Providence/Stoughton; MBTA bus: 10, 39; Amtrak: Acela, Northeast Regional, Lake Shore Limited
South End, Boston	Massachusetts Avenue	May 4, 1987	MBTA bus: 1
Roxbury, Boston	Ruggles	May 4, 1987	MBTA Commuter Rail: Franklin/Foxboro, Needham, Providence/Stoughton; MBTA bus: 8, 15, 19, 22, 23, 28, 43, 44, 45, 47, 65, 85, CT3; Mission Hill Link
Roxbury, Boston	Roxbury Crossing	May 4, 1987	MBTA bus: 15, 22, 23, 28, 44, 45, 66; Mission Hill Link
Roxbury, Boston	Jackson Square	May 4, 1987	MBTA bus: 14, 22, 29, 41, 44
Jamaica Plain, Boston	Stony Brook	May 4, 1987	
Jamaica Plain, Boston	Green Street	May 4, 1987	
Jamaica Plain, Boston	Forest Hills	May 4, 1987	MBTA Commuter Rail: Franklin/Foxboro, Needham, Providence/Stoughton; MBTA bus: 16, 21, 30, 31, 32, 34, 34E, 35, 36, 37, 38, 39, 40, 42, 50, 51

== Rolling stock ==
Series #	Year built	Manufacturer	Car length	Car width	Photo	Fleet numbers (total ordered)	Number in service (as of February 2026)
#14 Orange Line	2018–2025	CRRC/CRRC Massachusetts	65 ft (20 m)	9 ft 3 in (2.82 m)		1400–1551 (152 total)	150

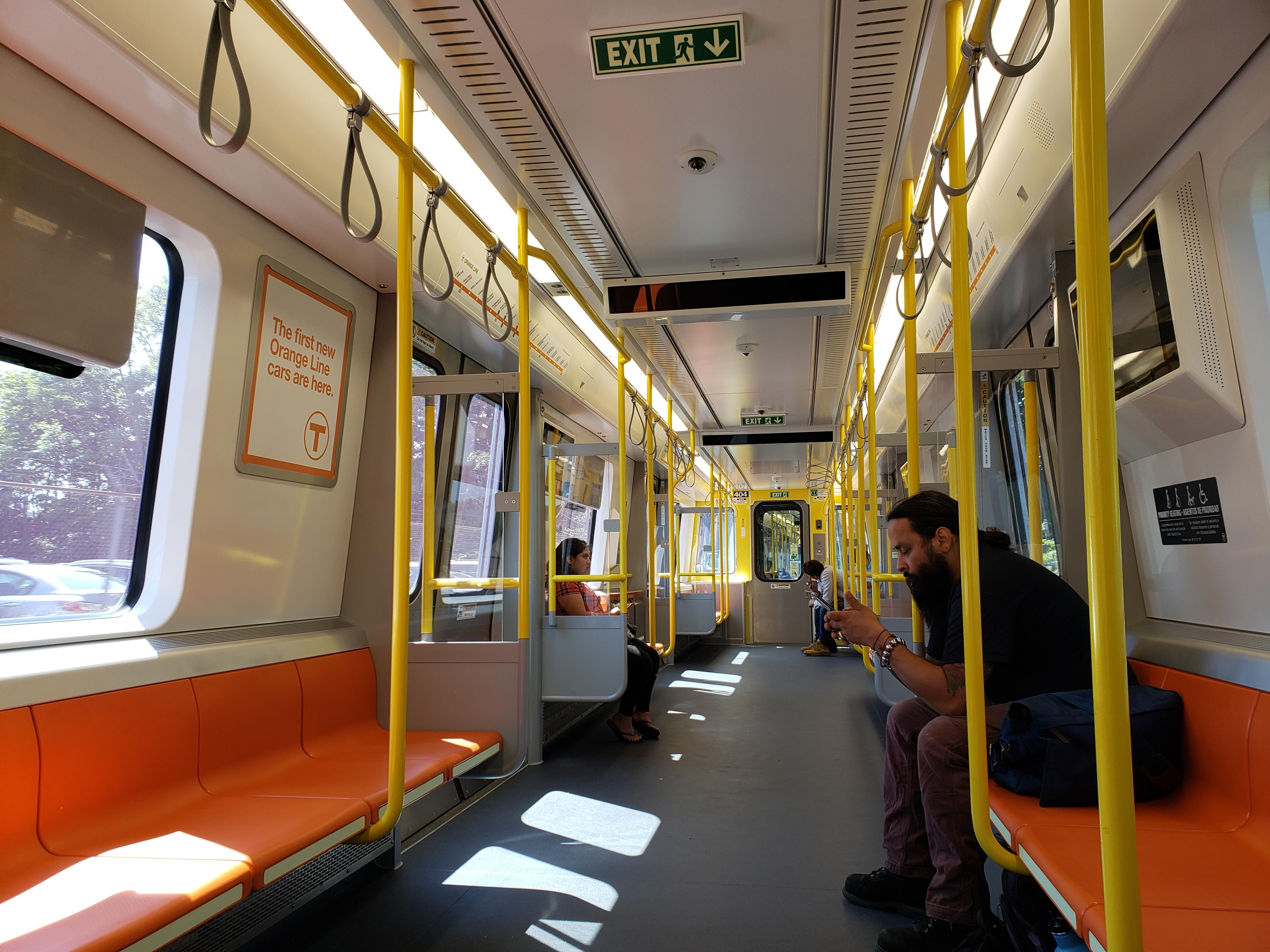
Interior of a new #14 CRRC car

The Orange Line is standard-gauge heavy rail and uses a third rail for power. The newer cars are being built by CRRC in a newly constructed plant in Springfield, Massachusetts, with 152 cars on order, along with additional cars for the Red Line. All in-service Orange Line trains run in six-car consists. Cars of the fleet are 65 feet (20 m) long and 9 ft 3 in (2.8 m) wide, with three pairs of doors on each side.

As of February 2022, weekday peak and afternoon service was scheduled to operate on 8-minute headways, with headways ranging from 8 to 12 minutes at other times. Vehicle utilization ranged between 8 trains (48 cars) and 13 trains (78 cars). However, rolling stock availability and longer trip times due to slow zones reduced service. By July 2023, headways were 10–12 minutes on weekdays. This was improved to nine-minute headways on August 27, 2023.

=== Former rolling stock ===
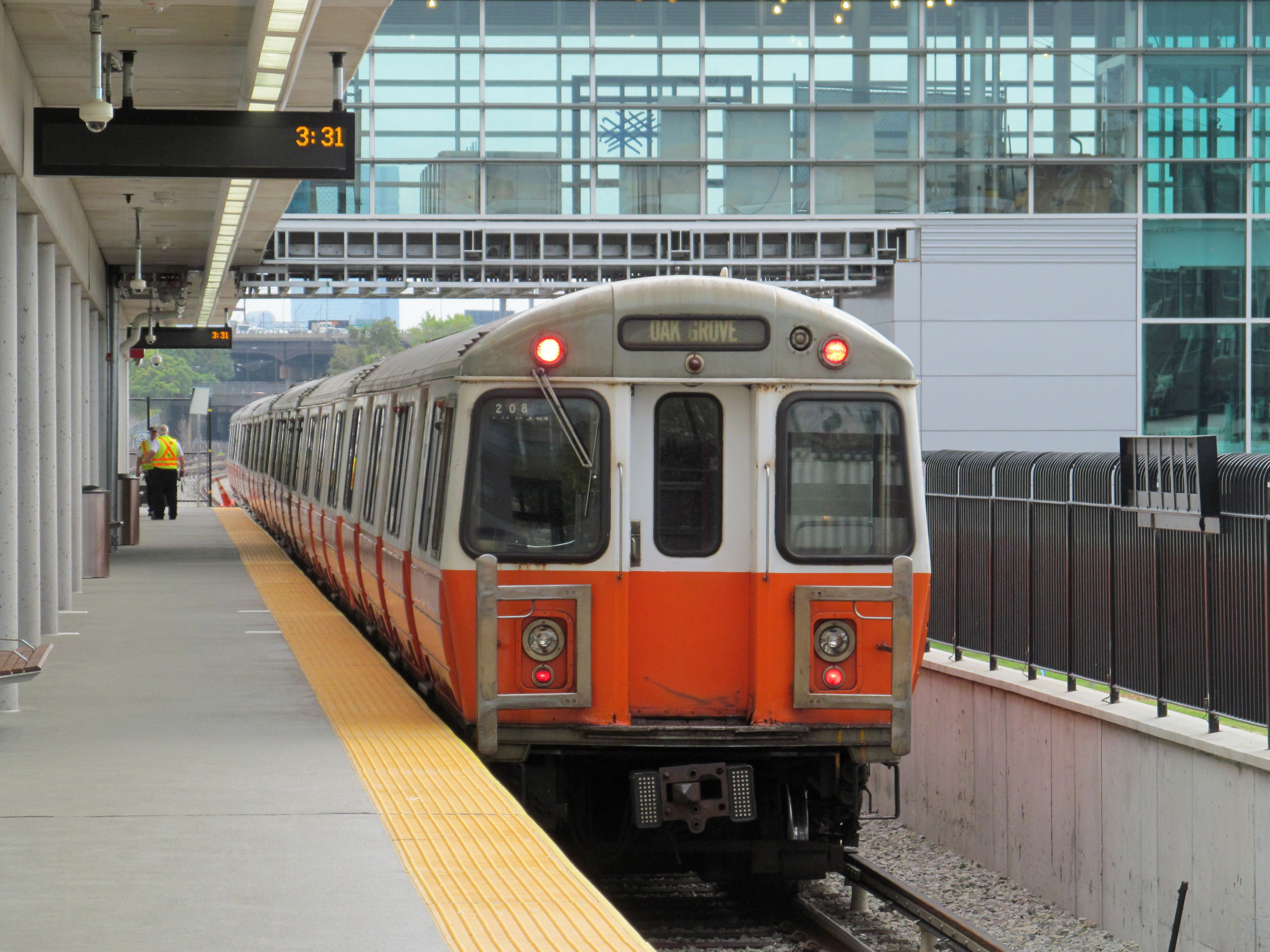
Older 1200-series Orange Line train leaving Assembly station

From the 1950s to 1981, the Orange Line used a fleet of Pullman-Standard heavy rail cars. These cars, known as 01100s, saw service on both the elevated and the northern extension before they were retired. Several remained on the property as Red Line work cars for some time before being scrapped. Units 01178-01179 are preserved at the Seashore Trolley Museum in Kennebunkport, Maine.

From 1981 to 2022, the Orange Line used a fleet of Hawker-Siddeley heavy rail cars. These cars, known as 01200s and nicknamed Orange Blossoms, featured reinforced roofs for pantographs. It was thought that if the Orange Line was extended, the MBTA would opt to use overhead collection. However, since these extensions were never built, pantographs were never installed. The 01200s, along with the Blue Line's 0600 cars manufactured at the same time, were based on the designs of the PATH PA3. After 41 years of service, the last 01200s ran on August 19, 2022, before the shutdown, and began to be sent to scrap on September 22, 2022. All were processed by the contractor Costello to remove hazardous materials and be recycled; two were offered to the Seashore Trolley Museum, but the offer was not accepted. The last pair, units 01280-01281, were hauled away on July 17, 2024.

=== New CRRC trains ===
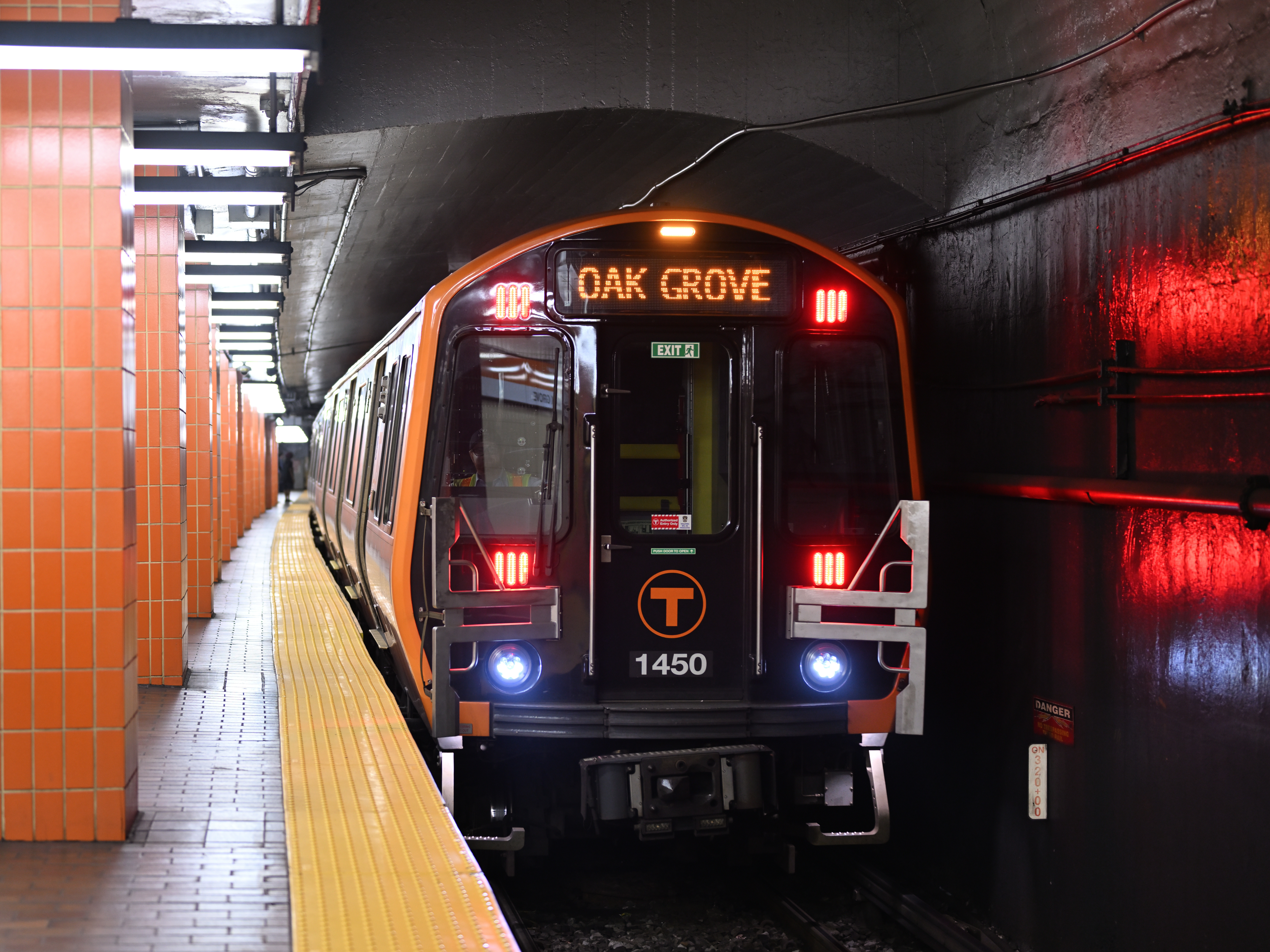
A CRRC-built #14 Orange Line train entering State station

In late 2008, the MBTA began the planning process for new Orange and Red Line vehicles. The agency originally planned for a simultaneous order for 146 Orange Line cars (to replace the whole fleet) and 74 Red Line cars (to replace the older 1500 and 1600 series cars). A similar order was used in the late 1970s for the current Orange Line cars and the old Blue Line cars, ordered at the same time and largely identical except for size and color. In October 2013, MassDOT announced plans for a $1.3 billion subway car order for the Orange and Red Lines, which would provide 152 new Orange Line cars to replace the existing 120-car fleet and add more frequent service.

On October 22, 2014, the MassDOT Board awarded a $566.6 million contract to a China based manufacturer CNR (which became part of CRRC the following year) to build 152 replacement railcars for the Orange Line, as well as additional cars for the Red Line. The other bidders were Bombardier Transportation, Kawasaki Heavy Industries and Hyundai Rotem. CNR began building the cars at a new manufacturing plant in Springfield, Massachusetts, with initial deliveries expected in 2018 and all cars in service by 2023. The Board forwent federal funding to allow the contract to specify the cars be built in Massachusetts, to create a local railcar manufacturing industry. In conjunction with the new rolling stock, the remainder of the $1.3 billion allocated for the project would pay for testing, signal improvements and expanded maintenance facilities, as well as other related expenses. Sixty percent of the car's components are sourced from the United States.

After delays due to issues with the train's control system, the first new train entered revenue service on August 14, 2019; Replacement of the signal system is expected to be complete by 2022 on the Orange Line; the total cost is $218 million for both the Red and Orange Lines.

While waiting for new cars, service has deteriorated due to maintenance problems with the old cars. The number of trains at rush hour was reduced from 17 (102 cars) to 16 (96 cars) in 2011; in the same year, daily ridership surpassed 200,000. Increased running times – largely due to longer dwell times from increased ridership – resulted in headways being lengthened from 5 minutes before 2011 to 6 minutes in 2016. The increased fleet size with the new trains will allow headways to be reduced to between 4 and 5 minutes at peak. In the interim, a 2016 test of platform markings at North Station which show boarding passengers where to stand to avoid blocking alighting passengers resulted in a one-third decrease in dwell times.

The new cars have faced several issues since their August entry into service. In November 2019, a car derailed while undergoing initial testing at the Wellington yard. The last car of a six car trainset had jumped the rails while going over a switch, however no major damage had been reported. Several months earlier, the first two trainsets were taken out of service due to safety issues following the inadvertent opening of a passenger door while the train was in motion. Cars were also rechecked in early December 2019, after issues with sounds combined with passenger overload necessitated removal from service. The first train was restored to service in January 2020. The trains were pulled again on March 16, 2021, after a derailment involving one of the cars. Buses replaced trains around the site of the derailment until April 12. The CRRC cars remained out of service as of July 2021; defective side bearer pads were identified as a contributing factor. These dampen the movements of the trucks (which include the wheels) with respect to the car bodies, but were found to be wearing in such a way as to produce too much friction. The first of the CRRC trainsets was returned to revenue service on August 20, after modifications were approved by the MBTA's Safety Department and the Department of Public Utilities. The new cars were again removed from service on May 19–23, 2022, after a braking issue on one car due to an incorrectly installed bolt, and again between June and July 2022 due to a battery failure. In December 2022, some new cars were removed from service due to failed power cables causing electric arcing on axles.

The CRRC contract requires delivery of all Orange Line cars by January 2022, with a fine of $500 per day per car for late deliveries. Delays began to accumulate in 2019, and then facilities in China and Springfield had to shut down and operate at reduced capacity for parts of 2020 due to the COVID-19 pandemic. As of September 2022, 78 of 152 new cars had been put in service on the Orange Line. This was enough for service almost all the time because of the rush hour service cap introduced after an FTA safety audit identified insufficient staffing of subway dispatchers. The MBTA indicated it would assess which delays were the fault of the contractor at the end of the contract. In 2023, cars were being delivered incomplete with incomplete paint repairs, connectors seen hanging on underframes, and parts sanded down to bare metal. The MBTA and CRRC have collaborated to resolve quality issues. In August 2023, MBTA General Manager has reported that the new Orange Line cars are exhibiting an average of approximately 114,000 miles traveled between failures, which surpasses the contractual requirement of 90,000 miles by over a quarter.

=== Facilities ===
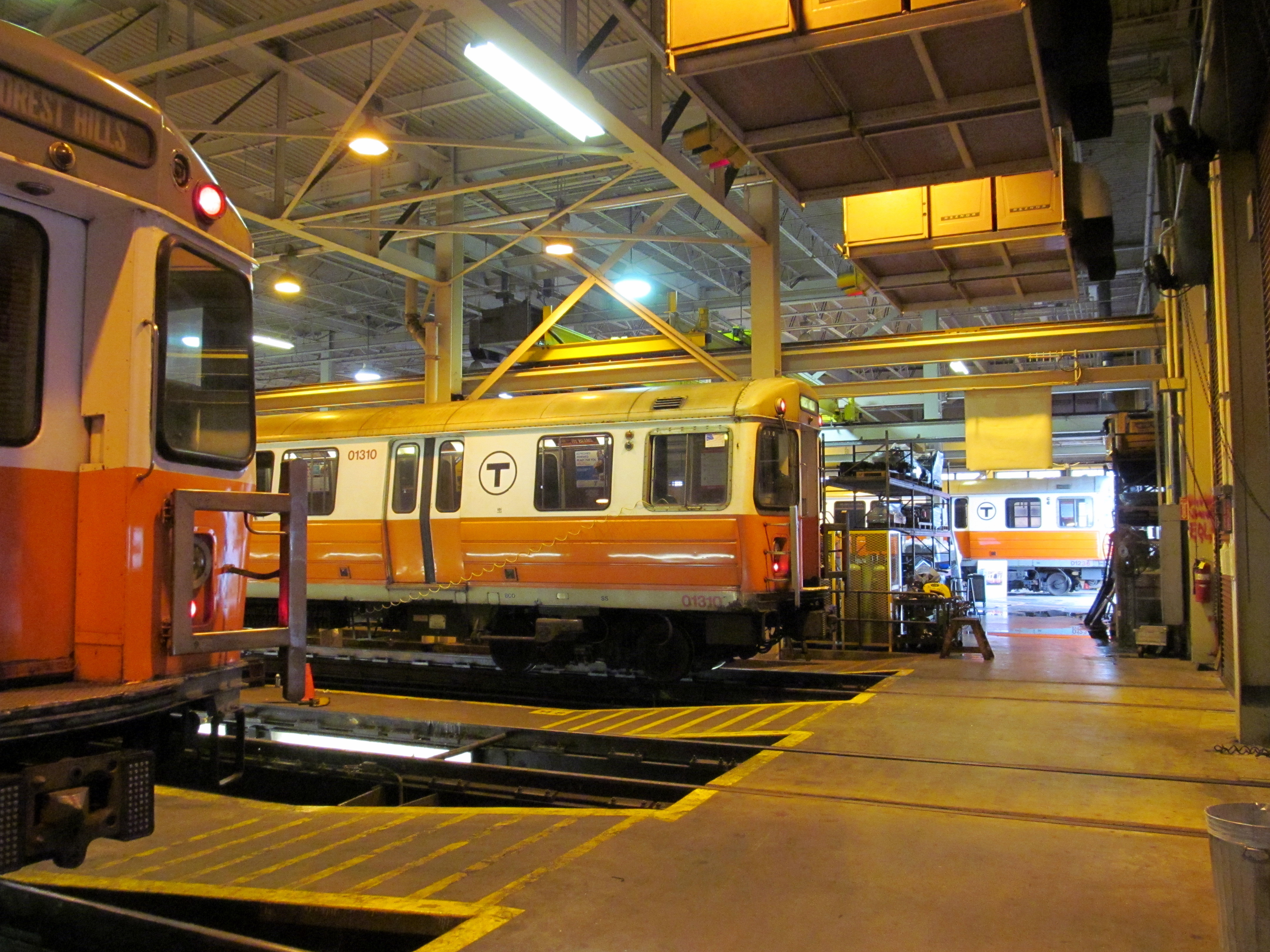
Orange Line trains in Wellington Carhouse, the Orange Line's heavy maintenance facility, in 2014

The Orange Line has two tracks for most of its length; a third track is present between Wellington station and the Charles River portal. This track is used to bypass construction on the other two tracks and for testing newly delivered cars for the Orange Line. The primary maintenance and storage facility is at Wellington station. Had the Orange Line been extended to Reading, the third track would have been the northbound local track, and the present-day northbound track would likely have become a bi-directional express track.

Expansion of the yard and carhouse was needed for the larger CRRC fleet. Yard work was substantially completed in August 2023, while carhouse expansion is expected to be complete in mid-2024.
