= North Station (subway) =

Rapid transit station in Boston, Massachusetts, US

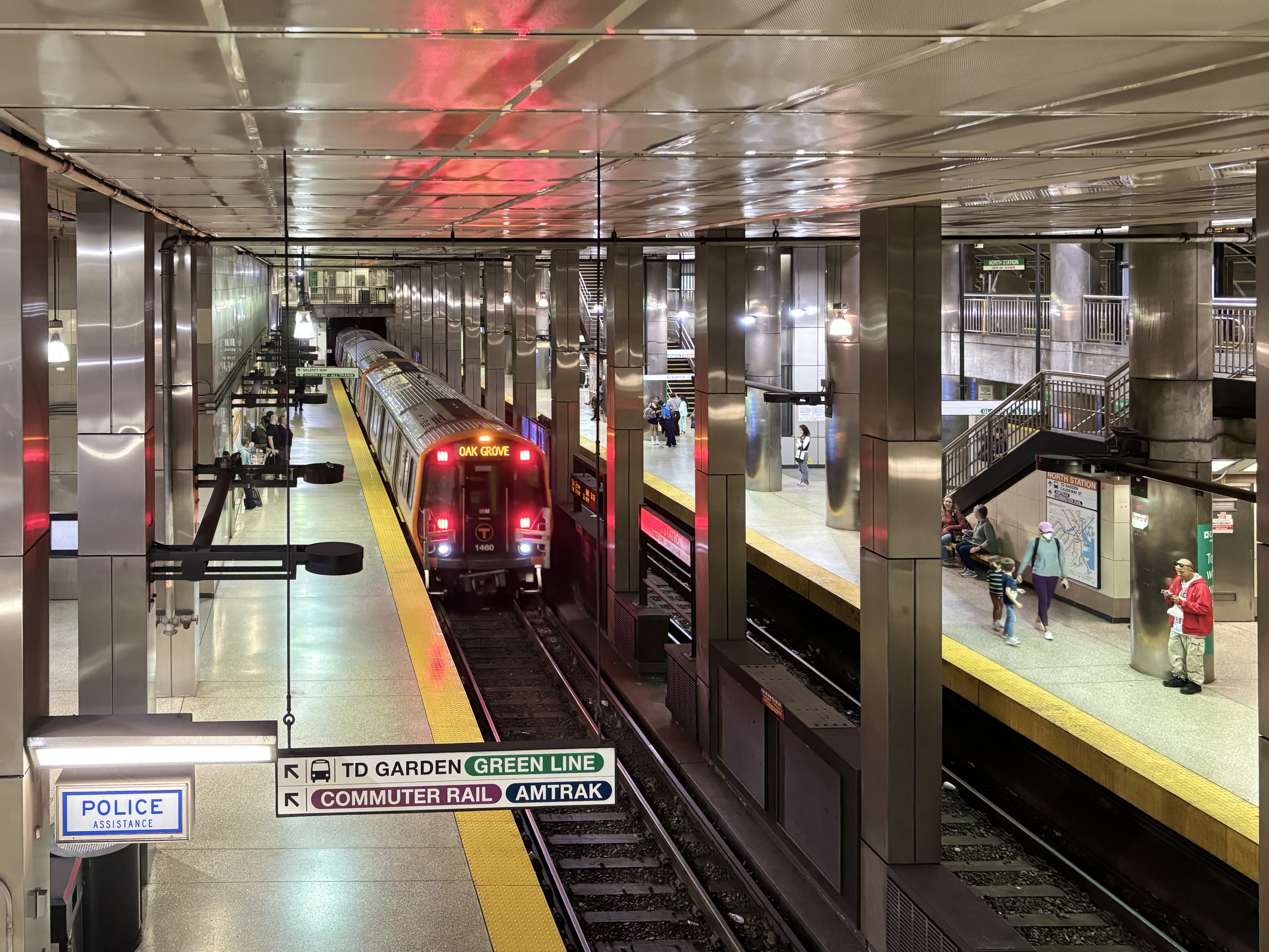
- A northbound Orange Line train at North Station in 2024

General information
- Location: 126 Causeway Street; Boston, Massachusetts
- Coordinates: 42.36523°N 71.06012°W
- Platforms: 2 side platforms, 1 island platform
- Tracks: 2 (Orange Line), 2 (Green Line)
- Connections: MBTA Commuter Rail at North Station; Amtrak Downeaster at North Station; MBTA bus: 4; EZRide; MBTA ferry: F10 (at Lovejoy Wharf); Seaport Ferry (at Lovejoy Wharf)

Construction
- Structure type: Underground
- Cycle facilities: 20 spaces; Bluebikes dock
- Accessible: Yes

History
- Opened: April 7, 1975 (Orange Line subway)
- Rebuilt: June 28, 2004 (Green Line subway)

Passengers
- FY2019: 16,273 daily boardings

Services
Preceding station	MBTA	Following station
Haymarket toward Riverside	Green Line D branch	Science Park toward Union Square
Haymarket toward Heath Street	Green Line E branch	Science Park toward Medford/Tufts
Haymarket toward Forest Hills	Orange Line	Community College toward Oak Grove
Former services
Preceding station	MBTA	Following station
Haymarket toward Boston College	Green Line B branch Cut back in 2004	Terminus
Haymarket toward Cleveland Circle	Green Line C branch Cut back in 2021	Terminus
Haymarket toward Forest Hills	Orange Line Charlestown Elevated rerouted in 1975	City Square toward Everett
Preceding station	Boston Elevated Railway	Following station
Battery Street toward South Station or Dudley	Atlantic Avenue Elevated Closed 1938	Terminus
Track layout
Location

North Station is an underground MBTA subway station in downtown Boston, Massachusetts. Served by the Massachusetts Bay Transportation Authority (MBTA) Green Line and Orange Line, it is connected to the surface terminal of the same name used by MBTA Commuter Rail and Amtrak. The station is fully accessible.

A surface streetcar terminal at Causeway Street, adjacent to North Union Station, was built in 1898 to serve the Tremont Street subway (predecessor to the modern Green Line). An elevated station for the Main Line (predecessor to the modern Orange Line) was added in 1901 as part of the Charlestown Elevated. A second elevated station was built in 1912 as part of the Causeway Street elevated, which acted as an extension of the Tremont Street subway. The Orange Line was moved underground in 1975 for the Haymarket North Extension project. The Green Line was added in 2004, forming a "superstation".

== Station layout ==
North Station is located under Haverhill Street and adjacent buildings in the block between Causeway Street and Valenti Way. The station has two below-ground levels, with fare control and a side platform for northbound Green Line trains on the upper level. The lower level has an island platform used by southbound Green Line and Orange Line trains (allowing a cross-platform transfer), plus a separate side platform for northbound Orange Line trains. A passageway connects the upper level to the surface North Station terminal.

== History ==
=== Elevated stations ===
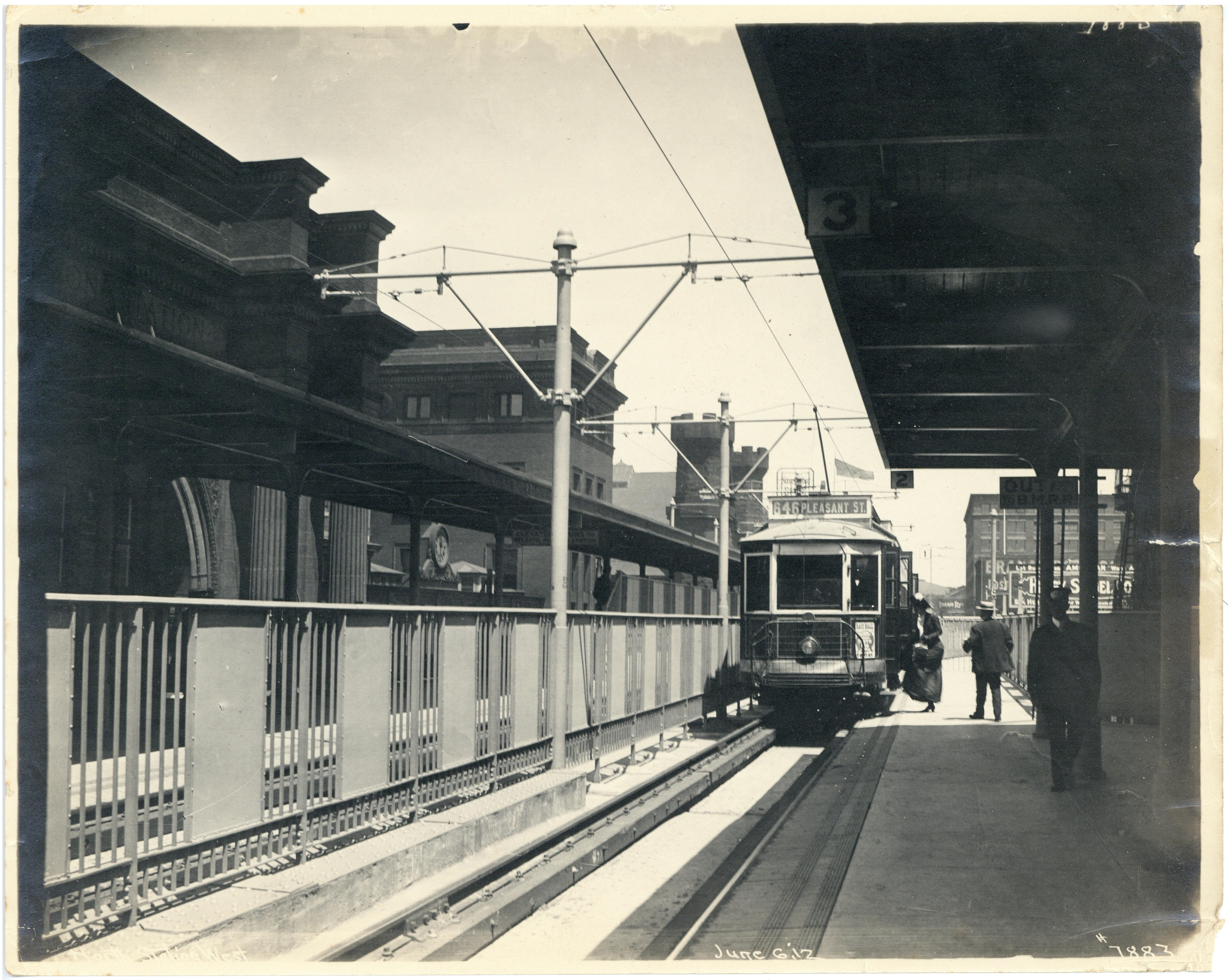
A streetcar at North Station in 1912

During planning of the Tremont Street subway in the 1890s, various configurations were considered for the north end of the tunnel. All designs included an incline to the surface, plus a surface or underground terminal with a loop, crossovers, or even a turntable to reverse streetcars. The Boston Transit Commission constructed a four-track incline; the inner tracks would lead to the surface, and the outer tracks would serve an underground loop station. This would allow streetcars from Charlestown and Cambridge to use the inner tracks to terminate at the Scollay Square and Adams Square loops, while streetcars that entered the subway from the south would loop at North Station.

However, the Boston Elevated Railway intended to attach the subway to its under-construction Charlestown Elevated line. The underground station plan was abandoned, and all four tracks used the Canal Street incline, with a surface terminal at Causeway Street. The Main Line Elevated opened in 1901 with an elevated station at North Union Station. Elevated trains ran south through the Tremont Street subway, north on the Charlestown Elevated, and east along the waterfront on the Atlantic Avenue Elevated. The elevated moved into its own tunnel in 1908. Just south of North Station was the Canal Street incline through which the Tremont Street subway (now part of the Green Line) went from surface to subway, and later the Washington Street Tunnel connected to the Charlestown Elevated (both later part of the Orange Line).

The Causeway Street Elevated opened in 1912, with an elevated streetcar station over Causeway Street. The project included a single-track platform for Atlantic Avenue Elevated shuttle trains. The Atlantic Avenue elevated was reduced to a North Station-South Station shuttle by 1928 after an accident at Beach Street, and closed entirely in 1938. It was demolished in 1942, but the shuttle platform remained intact.

On June 11, 1959, a bomb exploded in a locker in the Main Line Elevated station, killing one M.T.A. worker. Operations were suspended the rest of the day, and the track was up and running the next day, contrary to public expectations. Further bomb threats were phoned in, but no other bombs were found. Just a month before, a leaking gas line had caused an explosion outside North Station that injured 50 people.

=== Subway station ===
In April 1975, the Orange Line was moved underground as part of the Haymarket North Extension project. The rest of the Charlestown Elevated was demolished in 1975; the abandoned elevated station at North Station was kept intact until 1976 for possible reuse, but later demolished as well. The Canal Street loop was closed on June 18, 1977; it reopened on December 15 as a three-track stub-end terminal for the new LRVs. The west entrance to the elevated Green Line station was closed on January 3, 1981, during budget cuts.

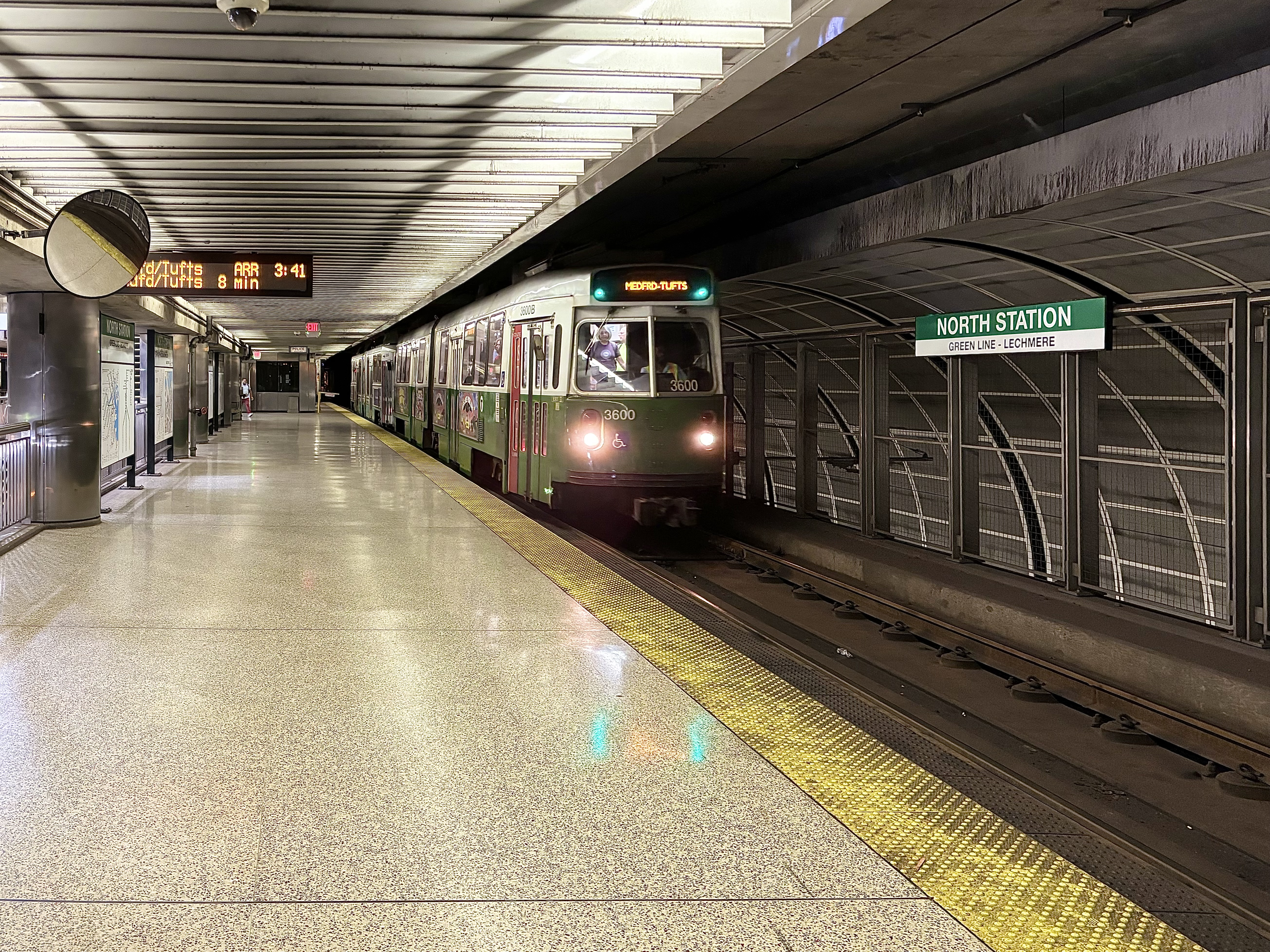
A northbound Green Line train at North Station in 2024

In February 1993, the state reached a deal with a developer for the replacement of the aging Boston Garden. As part of the agreement, the MBTA was granted easements for a Green Line tunnel under the arena to replace the Causeway Street Elevated and for a combined underground "superstation" for the Green and Orange lines. On March 28, 1997, the Green Line C branch surface terminal at Canal Street was permanently closed for construction of the new tunnel under North Station. The Orange Line station was made accessible with the addition of elevators in 2001. The elevated Green Line station (which had an elevator only to the Lechmere-bound platform) was outfitted with portable lifts and mini-high platforms around that time for temporary accessibility while the new underground station was constructed.

On June 25, 2004, Green Line service was removed from the Causeway Street Elevated. Green Line trains began using the underground "superstation" shared with the Orange Line on June 28. Southbound Green Line and Orange Line trains share an island platform, while northbound Green Line trains stop at the mezzanine level. North Station was the terminal of the Green Line until November 12, 2005, when the new tunnel opened and service to Lechmere resumed. The station cost $262 million to construct. A pedestrian tunnel under Causeway Street, with a new headhouse adjacent to North Station, opened in early 2005. An artwork titled Currents, by Gary Duehr, was placed on the wall behind the southbound Green Line track. The aluminum mural is a strip of 120 sepia-toned photos which appear as an animation from passing trains. The work, which depicts Wollaston Beach in Quincy, was originally placed on the Silver Line level at South Station.

The MBTA subway headhouse on the north side of Causeway Street was permanently closed on January 2, 2016; the underground connection which replaced it opened on January 6, 2019. On June 24, 2019, the MBTA Board awarded a $29.7 million, 16-month contract for full cleaning, wayfinding signage replacement, and other improvements at North Station, Haymarket, State, and Downtown Crossing stations. The replacement of 40,000 square feet (3,700 m^{2}) of flooring at North Station with terrazzo was completed in April 2021. All work was completed in June 2021. The MBTA plans to add elevators connecting both Orange Line platforms to the south end of the fare mezzanine, providing redundant access to the platforms. A $10.5 million design contract for Arlington, North Station, and Sullivan Square was awarded in April 2020. Design work for North Station was completed in late 2023.

On May 24, 2020, service to Science Park and Lechmere was temporarily replaced by buses to North Station for construction of the Green Line Extension project, leaving North Station as the northern terminus of Green Line service. The D branch was extended to North Station on October 24, 2021, and the C branch cut back to Government Center, as part of changes in preparation for the opening of the extension. E branch service north of North Station to Lechmere resumed on March 21, 2022, accompanied by an extension to Union Square. The station was closed in August and September 2022 during overlapping closures of the Orange Line (August 19 to September 18) and the northern portion of the Green Line (August 22 to September 18). After the closure, the D branch was extended to Union Square; the E branch mostly ran to Union Square or Lechmere until December 12, 2022, when it was extended to Medford/Tufts on a second branch.
