= Community College station =

Rapid transit station in Charlestown, Massachusetts, US

Community College
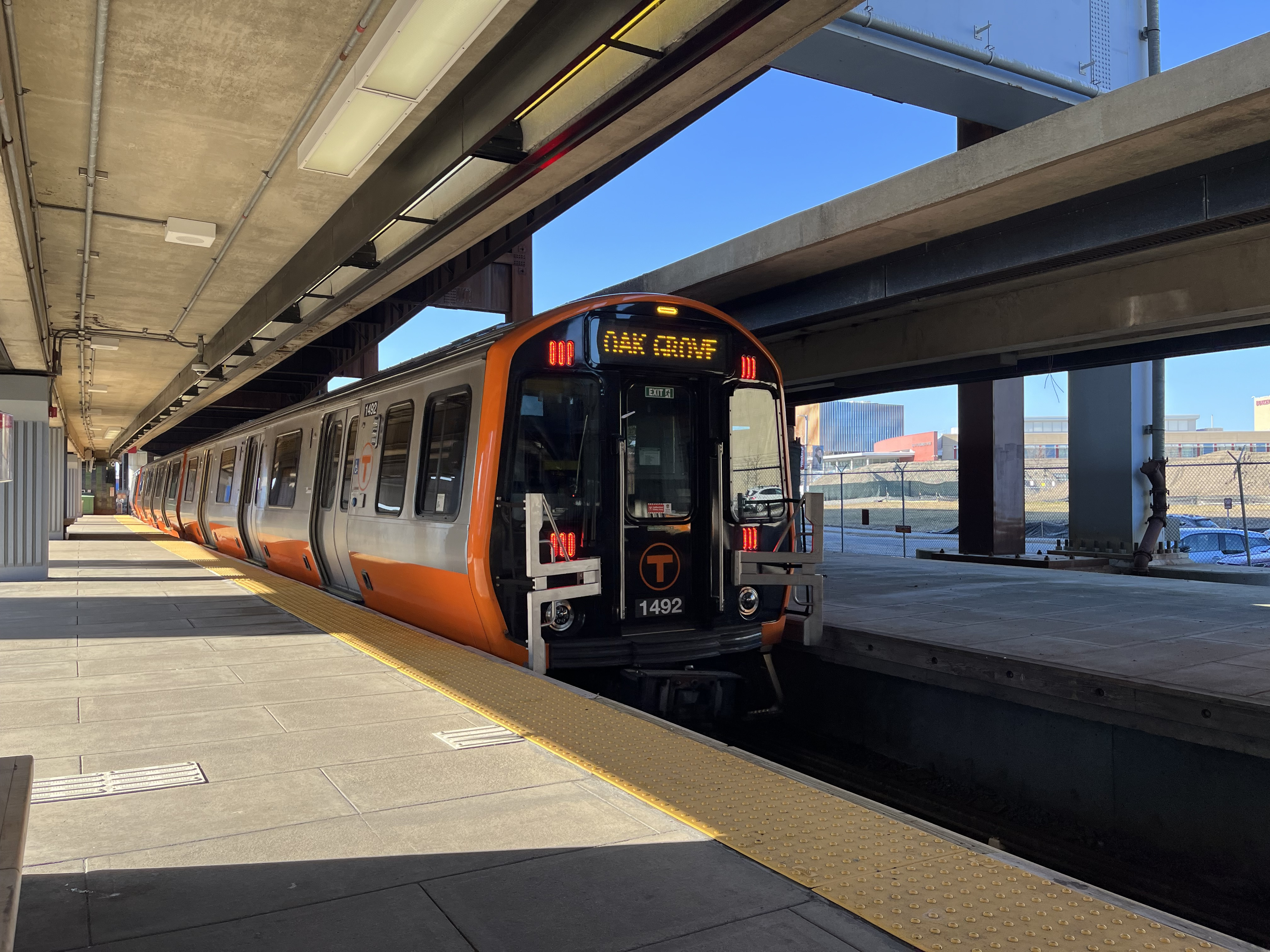
- A northbound train leaving Community College station in 2024

General information
- Location: Austin Street west of Rutherford Avenue; Charlestown, Boston, Massachusetts
- Coordinates: 42.37378°N 71.07014°W
- Line: Haymarket North Extension
- Platforms: 2 island platforms (1 unused)
- Tracks: 3 (2 in regular service)

Construction
- Cycle facilities: 5 spaces
- Accessible: Yes

History
- Opened: April 7, 1975

Passengers
- FY2019: 4,159 daily boardings

Services
Preceding station	MBTA	Following station
North Station toward Forest Hills	Orange Line	Sullivan Square toward Oak Grove
Location

Community College station is a rapid transit station on the MBTA Orange Line in Boston, Massachusetts. It is located in the Charlestown neighborhood off Austin Street near New Rutherford Avenue (MA-99), under the double-decked elevated structure carrying Interstate 93 to the Zakim Bunker Hill Bridge. The station is named for the adjacent Bunker Hill Community College. The station opened in April 1975, replacing the City Square and Thompson Square stations of the Charlestown Elevated. It was made accessible around 2005.

== Station layout ==
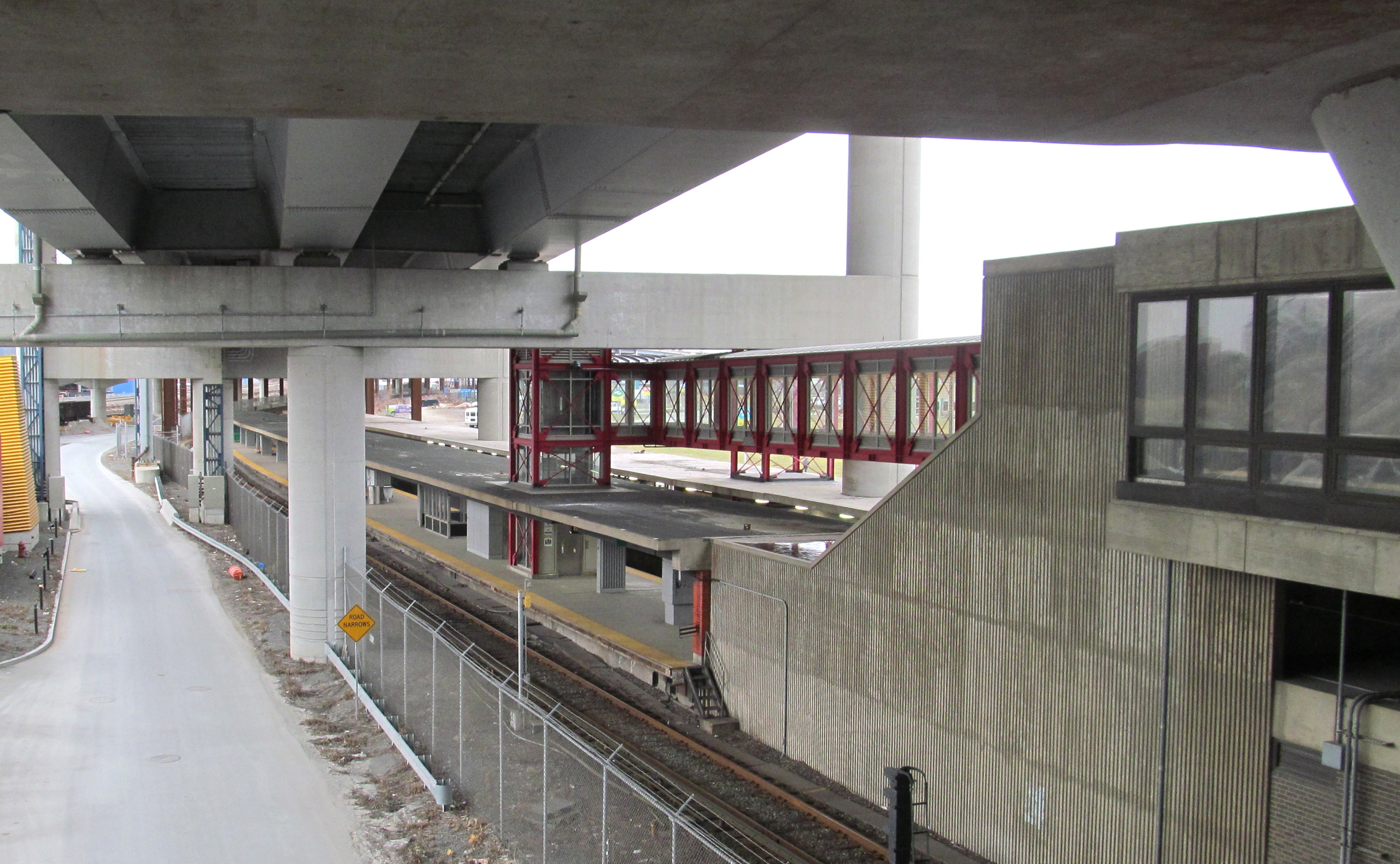
Community College station is built under the double-decked elevated I-93 highway

Community College station is located under the double-decked elevated Interstate 93 at the southwest edge of Charlestown, Boston, just south of Bunker Hill Community College (BHCC) and west of New Rutherford Avenue (Route 99). East Cambridge and the NorthPoint development are to the southwest, with the MBTA Commuter Rail Maintenance Facility and the Inner Belt District industrial park to the northwest and highway ramps to the southeast.

The station has two island platforms and three tracks. Only the west platform is in use; inbound (southbound) tracks use the west track, with outbound trains using the center track. The east platform and track are not used for revenue service. A fare mezzanine is located over the tracks at the south end of the station. The mezzanine is connected to the north sidewalk of the Gilmore Bridge, which carries Austin Street over the Orange Line and the North Station approach tracks. A footbridge also connects the mezzanine directly to BHCC.

== History ==
=== Previous stations ===
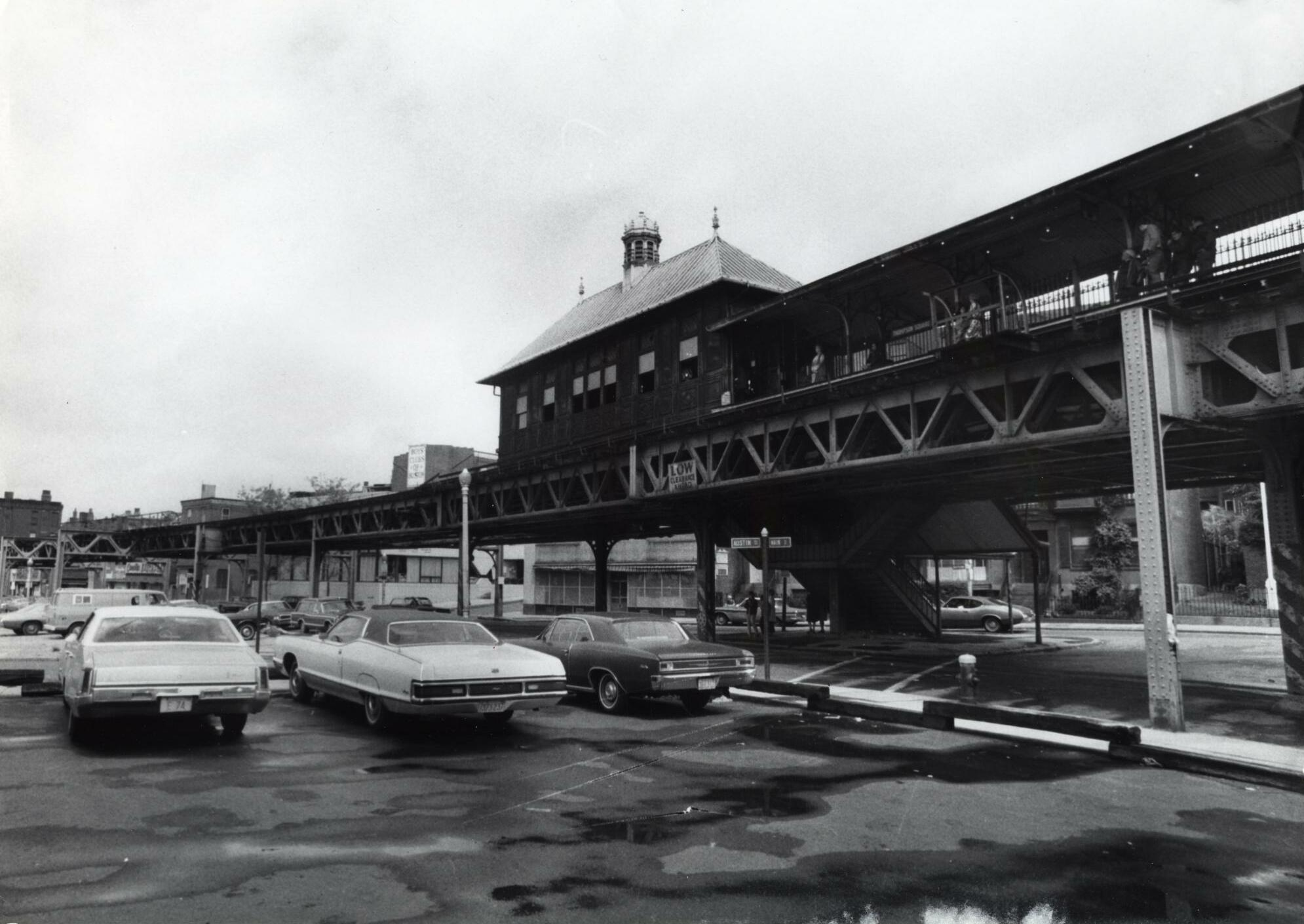
Thompson Square station around 1970

For much of the 19th century, the four major northside railroads (the Fitchburg, Boston and Lowell (B&L), Boston and Maine (B&M), and Eastern) did not share any trackage on the approach to Boston. (Not until North Union Station in 1893 did they share a depot). At that time, Charlestown was separated from East Cambridge by a large cove, Millers River. The Fitchburg crossed the B&M and the Eastern at Prison Point (then the site of a substantial state prison), near the modern location of Community College station. The Fitchburg and B&M had substantial freight depots nearby, and the B&M briefly had a Charlestown station around the 1850s. For some period after the Fitchburg's Boston terminal replaced its Charlestown terminal in 1848, a flag stop was made at the Prison Point Bridge.

The Charlestown Elevated section of the Boston Elevated Railway's Main Line opened in June 1901, with three elevated stations in Charlestown. The Thompson Square station was located one-third of a mile east of the current station along Austin Street at Main Street, while the City Square station was located half a mile south along Rutherford Avenue at Chelsea Street. The elevated was unpopular with many local residents, as it was noisy and blocked out sunlight to Main Street. In 1917, the elevated structure was slated to be replaced with a more permanent subway line along the same Main Street routing, but this project was canceled by the US's entry into World War I.

=== Community College station ===
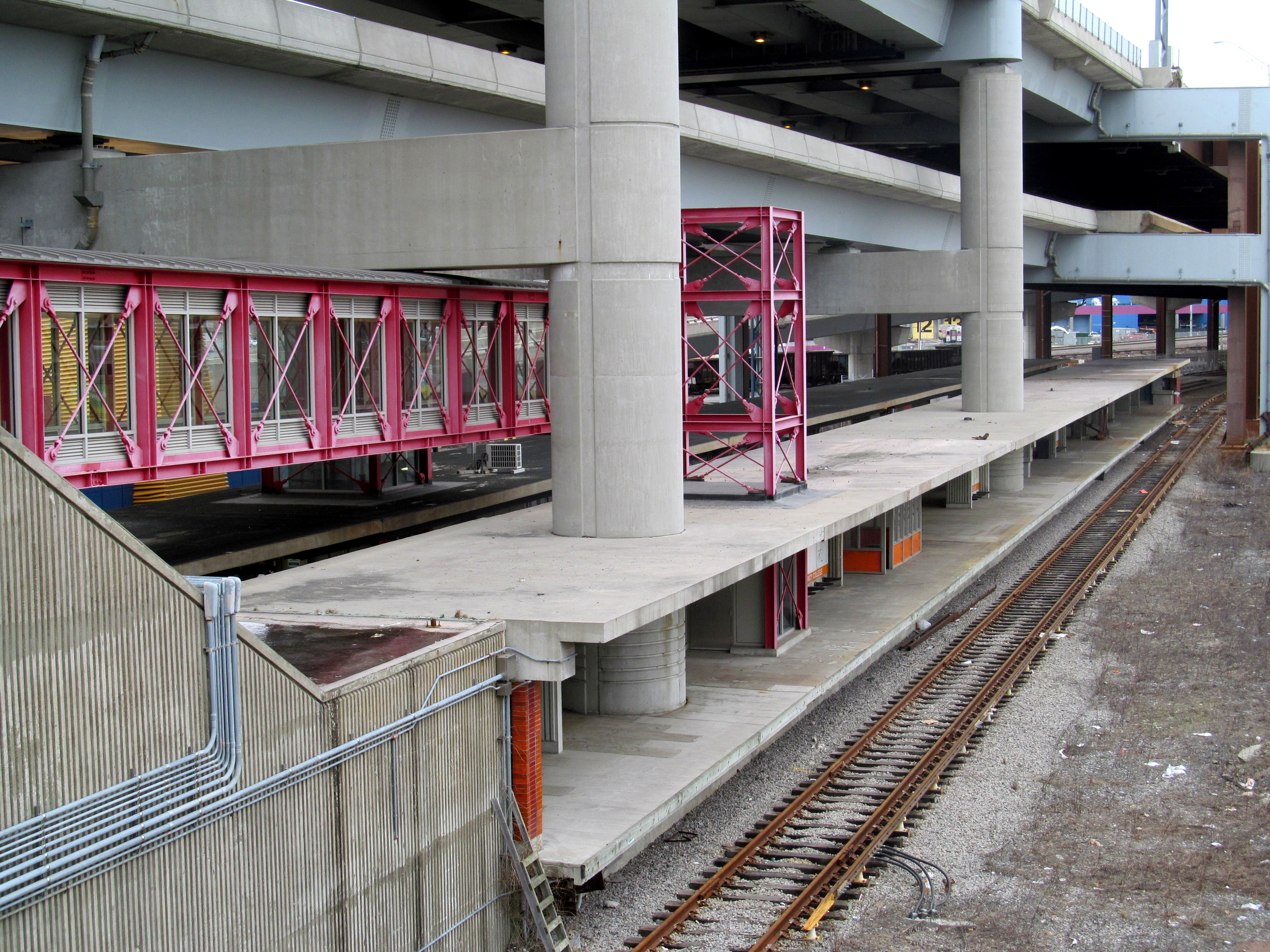
The unused east platform in 2013

In the late 1960s, the MBTA began work on the Haymarket North Extension project. It included a tunnel segment north from Haymarket through a new underground stop at North Station, then under the Charles River to a portal south of the Gilmore Bridge. From there, the extension was built along the Haverhill Line commuter rail right of way. Community College station was built to replace the two elevated stops nearby in Charlestown. The new route opened to Sullivan Square on April 7, 1975. The Main Line had previously been renamed as the Orange Line in 1967, as part of a systemwide rebranding by the newly formed MBTA.

Like the Sullivan Square and Wellington stations, Community College was built with a second island platform serving the outbound track plus a third express track. This extra infrastructure was to be used for the Orange Line's planned extension to Reading to replace commuter rail service on the line. (Continuing commuter rail service to Andover and Haverhill was to be via the Wildcat Branch). However, the Orange Line extension was cut short to Oak Grove due to local opposition in Melrose, and no express service ever ran. The second platform is open for outbound passengers at busy Sullivan Square and Wellington, but at less-busy Community College it sits unused.

Unlike the four other original stations on the Haymarket North Extension, Community College was not built with a busway. Bus routes in East Cambridge already terminated at Lechmere station to the west, while Charlestown routes 92 and 93 already extended to Haymarket station along historic streetcar routings. Routes 111 and 112, which had terminated at City Square, were not extended to Community College; route 111 was instead extended to Haymarket, while route 112 was rerouted to Maverick. In December 1975, outbound trips on route 92 were rerouted to Rutherford Avenue between Austin Street and School Street to serve BHCC and the station. However, it returned to its previous routing by December 1977. In 1987, the MBTA considered construction of a parking garage at the station.

The station was not originally accessible. An elevator to the main platform, reached by a footbridge between the platforms, was constructed as part of the Big Dig. Bidding took place in 2002. Shaft framework was installed for the unused second platform, but no elevator machinery was installed. The renovations were completed around 2005. The entire Orange Line, including Community College station, was closed from August 19 to September 18, 2022, during maintenance work. The brick surface of the entrance plaza was replaced with concrete in May–June 2024 to improve accessibility.
