= Atlantic Line =

The following railroad lines have been called the Atlantic Line or a similar name:

- The Atlantic Branch of the Long Island Rail Road in New York City
- The Atlantic Avenue Elevated line of the Boston Elevated Railway
- The Atlantic City Line of New Jersey Transit
- The southern pair of tracks of the South London Line
- The Atlantic Coast Line, Cornwall
