= City Square station =

Former rapid transit station in Boston, Massachusetts, US

City Square
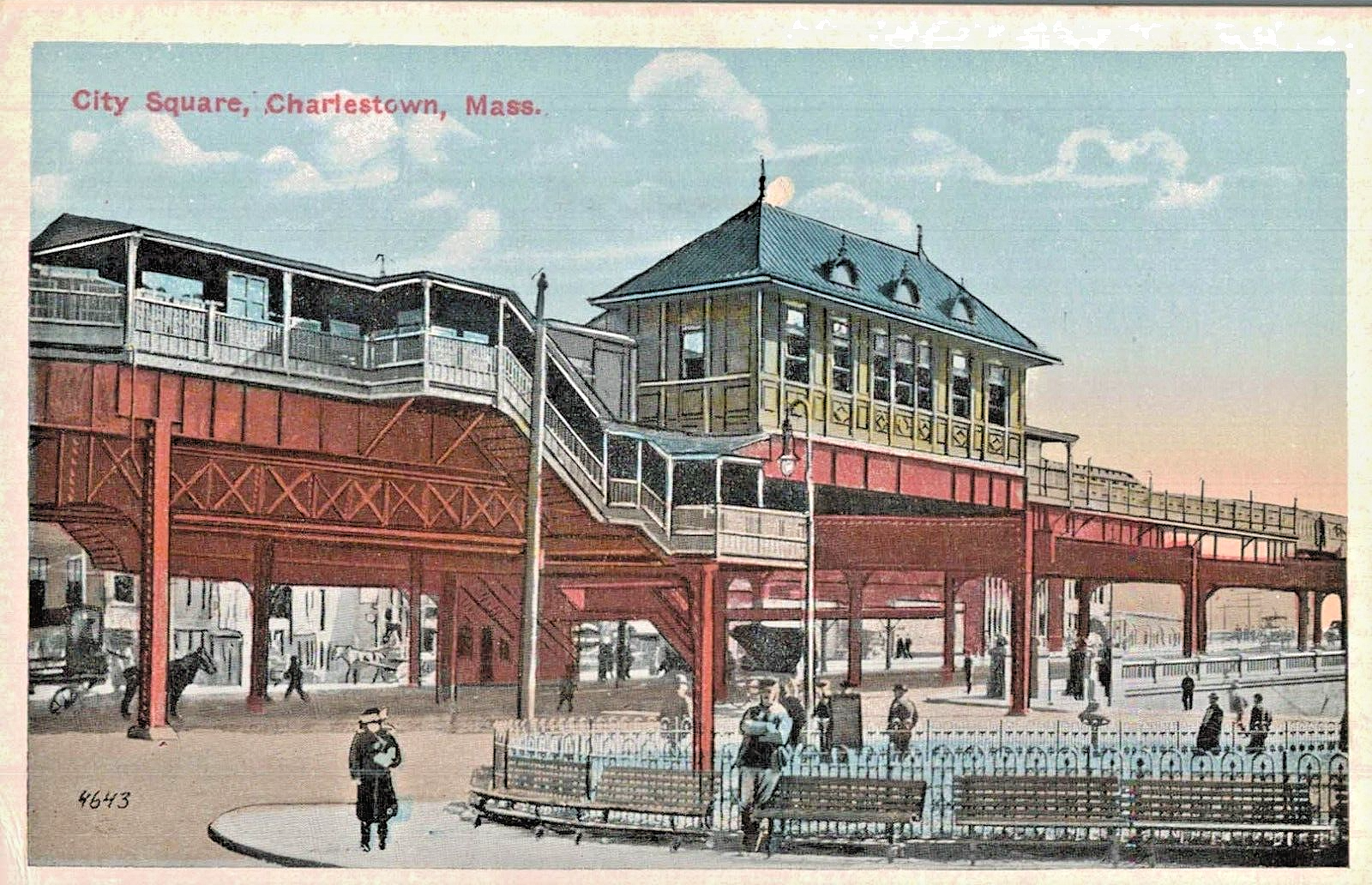
- Postcard of the station, circa 1920s

General information
- Location: Main Street at City Square; Charlestown, Boston, Massachusetts
- Coordinates: 42°22′17.97″N 71°3′42.58″W
- Line: Charlestown Elevated
- Platforms: 2 side platforms
- Tracks: 2

History
- Opened: June 10, 1901
- Closed: April 4, 1975
- Rebuilt: 1909

Services
Preceding station	MBTA	Following station
North Station toward Forest Hills	Orange Line	Thompson Square toward Everett
Location

City Square station was an elevated rapid transit station located at City Square in the Charlestown section of Boston, Massachusetts. Served by the MBTA subway's Orange Line, it was part of the Charlestown Elevated, which was open from 1901 to 1975.

== History ==
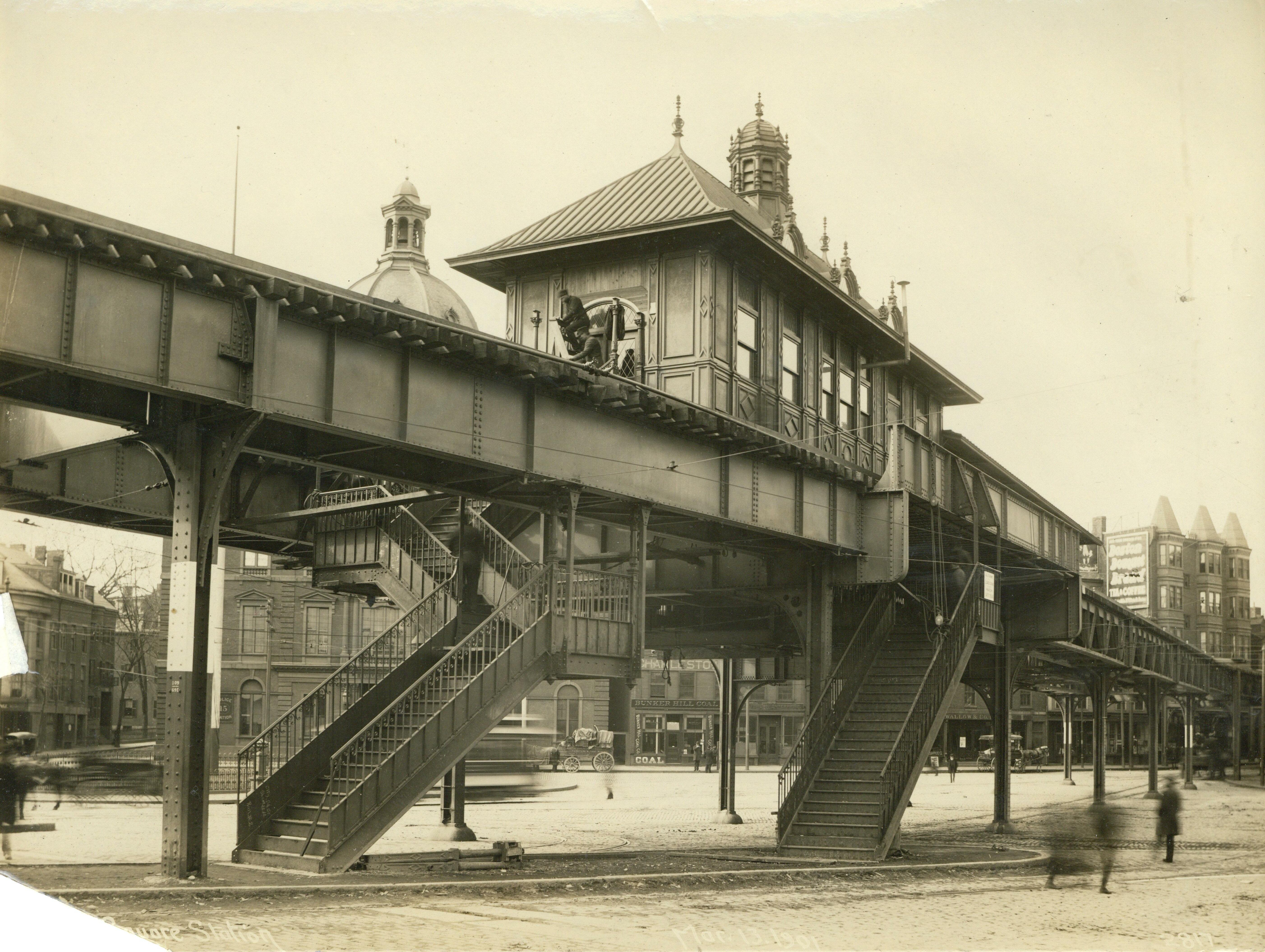
City Square station in 1901

The Charlestown Elevated opened on June 10, 1901. City Square station originally had a single island platform about 130 feet (40 m) long – enough for three-car trains. (Note: The original Main Line Elevated cars were approximately 46 feet (14 m) long. Later generations of cars were longer – 55 feet (17 m) and 65 feet (20 m).) The platform was lengthened northward three times to accommodate longer trains. An extension to 175 feet (53 m) for four-car trains was constructed in October–November 1901. Extension for five-car trains took place in early 1905, and for six-car trains in November 1908.

The 1908 extension was only temporary; a larger reconstruction of the station was needed to serve eight-car trains. Two side platforms were built to replace the island platform. Work took place in 1909; train service was not interrupted during construction.

The Main Line Elevated, of which the Charlestown Elevated was the northern leg, was operated by the Boston Elevated Railway until 1947. It was operated by the Metropolitan Transit Authority (MTA) from 1947, then by the Massachusetts Bay Transportation Authority (MBTA). The MBTA renamed the line as the Orange Line in 1967. The Charlestown Elevated was closed on April 4, 1975, and replaced by the Haymarket North Extension.
