= Thompson Square station =

Former rapid transit station in Boston, Massachusetts, US

Thompson Square
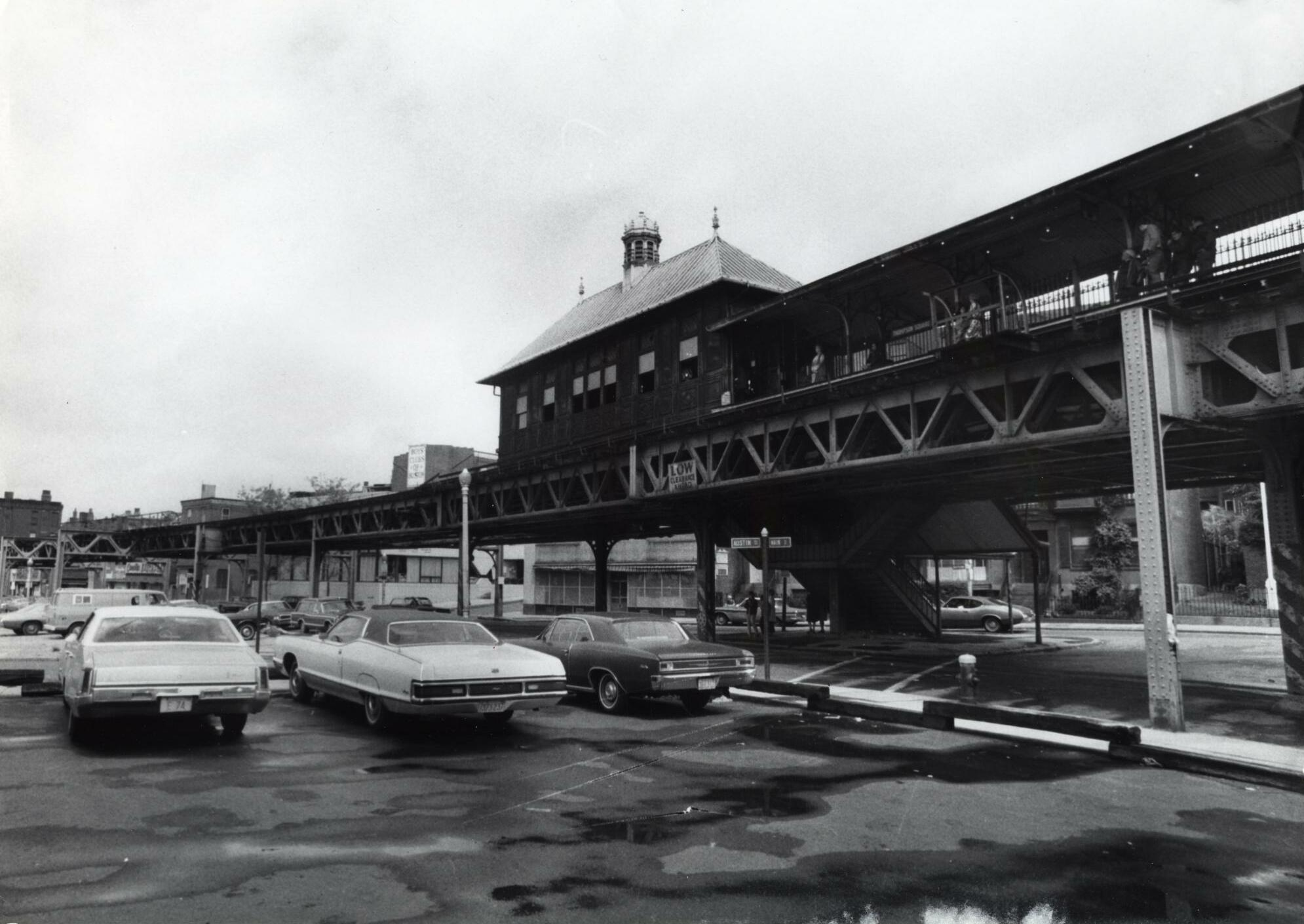
- Thompson Square station, circa 1970

General information
- Location: Charlestown, Boston, Massachusetts
- Coordinates: 42°22′30.16″N 71°3′50.52″W
- Owner: Massachusetts Bay Transportation Authority
- Line: Charlestown Elevated
- Platforms: 1 island platform
- Tracks: 2

History
- Opened: May 22, 1902
- Closed: April 4, 1975

Services
Preceding station	MBTA	Following station
City Square toward Forest Hills	Orange Line	Sullivan Square toward Everett
Location

Thompson Square station was a rapid transit station in Charlestown, Boston, Massachusetts. It served the Charlestown Elevated, part of the MBTA's Orange Line, from 1902 until 1975.

== History ==
Thompson Square station opened on May 22, 1902, almost a year after the rest of the Charlestown Elevated line, as an infill station.

On December 5, 1960, the MTA began operating "modified express service" on the Elevated during the morning rush hour. Every other train bypassed Thompson Square and three other stations. This was discontinued in September 1961 to reduce wait times at the skipped stations, all of which were outdoors.

It was closed in 1975, when the line was rerouted into a tunnel that was constructed as part of the Haymarket North Extension project. The station was lowered to the ground, with plans to reuse the structure as a restaurant, but it was destroyed by fire on April 19, 1976, before the conversion could be done.
