= Causeway Street elevated =

Former elevated railway in Boston, Massachusetts

Causeway Street Elevated
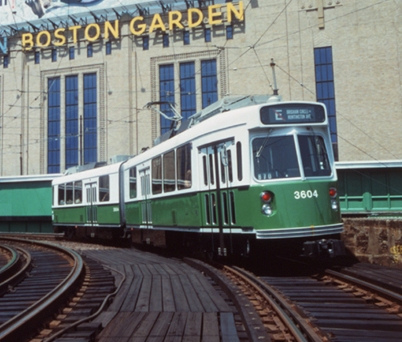
- An outbound Green Line train on the Causeway Elevated in front of Boston Garden. The photo dates to between 1989 (Brigham Circle Line restored to Heath Street) and 1998 (Boston Garden demolished).

Overview
- Status: Demolished
- Locale: Boston, Massachusetts, United States

Service
- Type: Elevated railway
- System: Massachusetts Bay Transportation Authority
- Services: Green Line

History
- Opened: June 1, 1912
- Closed: June 25, 2004

Technical
- Character: Streetcar services
- Track gauge: 4 ft 8 1/2 in (1,435 mm) standard gauge

The Causeway Street elevated was an elevated section of the MBTA Green Line light rail system in Boston, located in the area near North Station. It was in operation from 1912 until 2004, when it was replaced with a new tunnel and underground station on a slightly different alignment.

== Description ==
The Causeway Street elevated began at the Canal Street incline in parallel with the Charlestown Elevated tracks, and after "splitting" away from it just south of Boston Garden, turned southwest above Causeway Street with an elevated station at North Station in front of the Boston Garden, and then turned northwest above Lowell Street, before joining the Lechmere Viaduct at Leverett Circle. It was a two-track structure on steel girders, similar to the Charlestown Elevated, Atlantic Avenue Elevated, and Washington Street Elevated, which were opened between 1901 and 1909.

The Causeway Street elevated was one of the last pieces of elevated line constructed in Boston, and, except for a short section remaining at Lechmere, was the last section in service.

== History ==
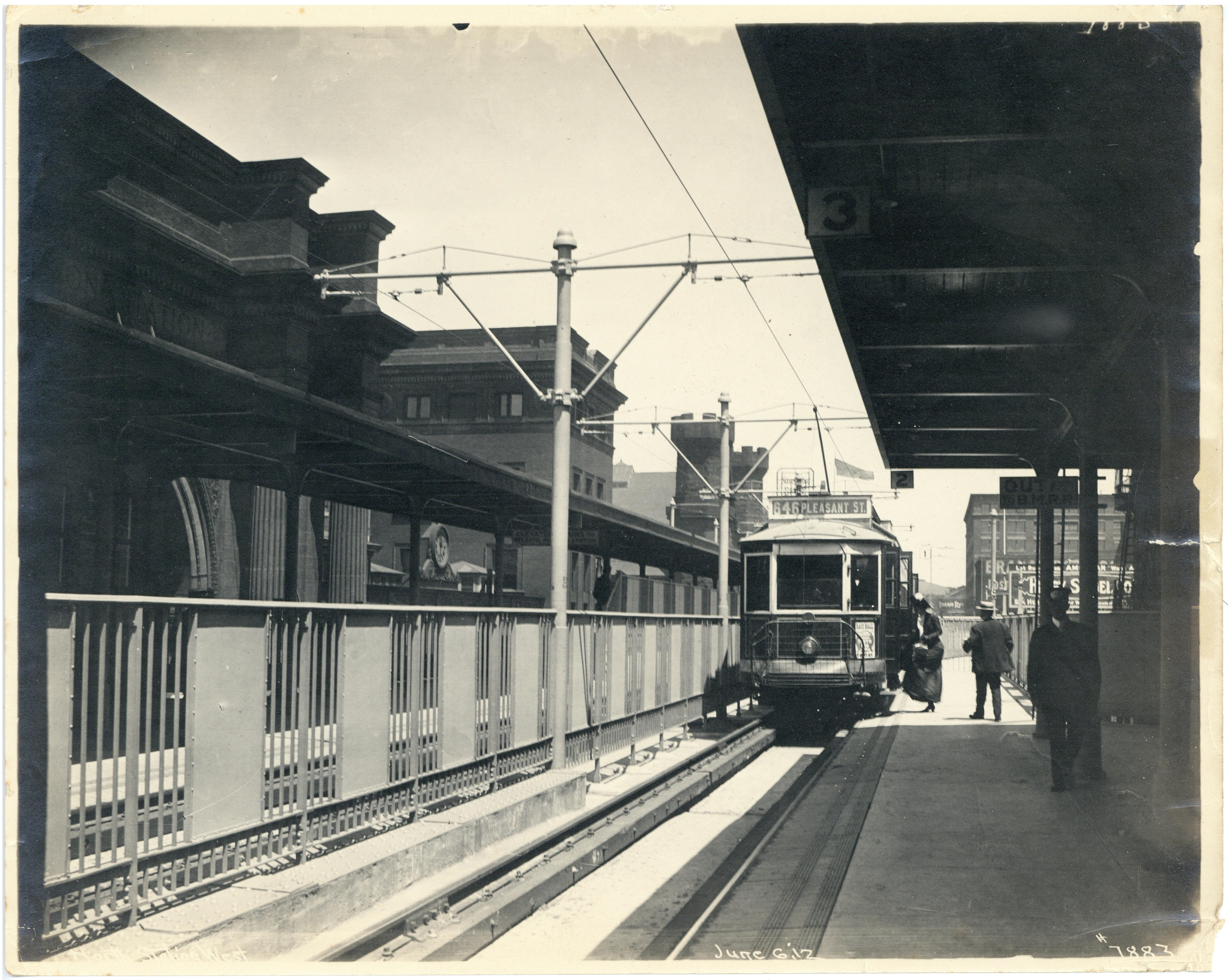
An inbound streetcar bound for Pleasant Street at the North Station elevated station in 1912, just after its opening

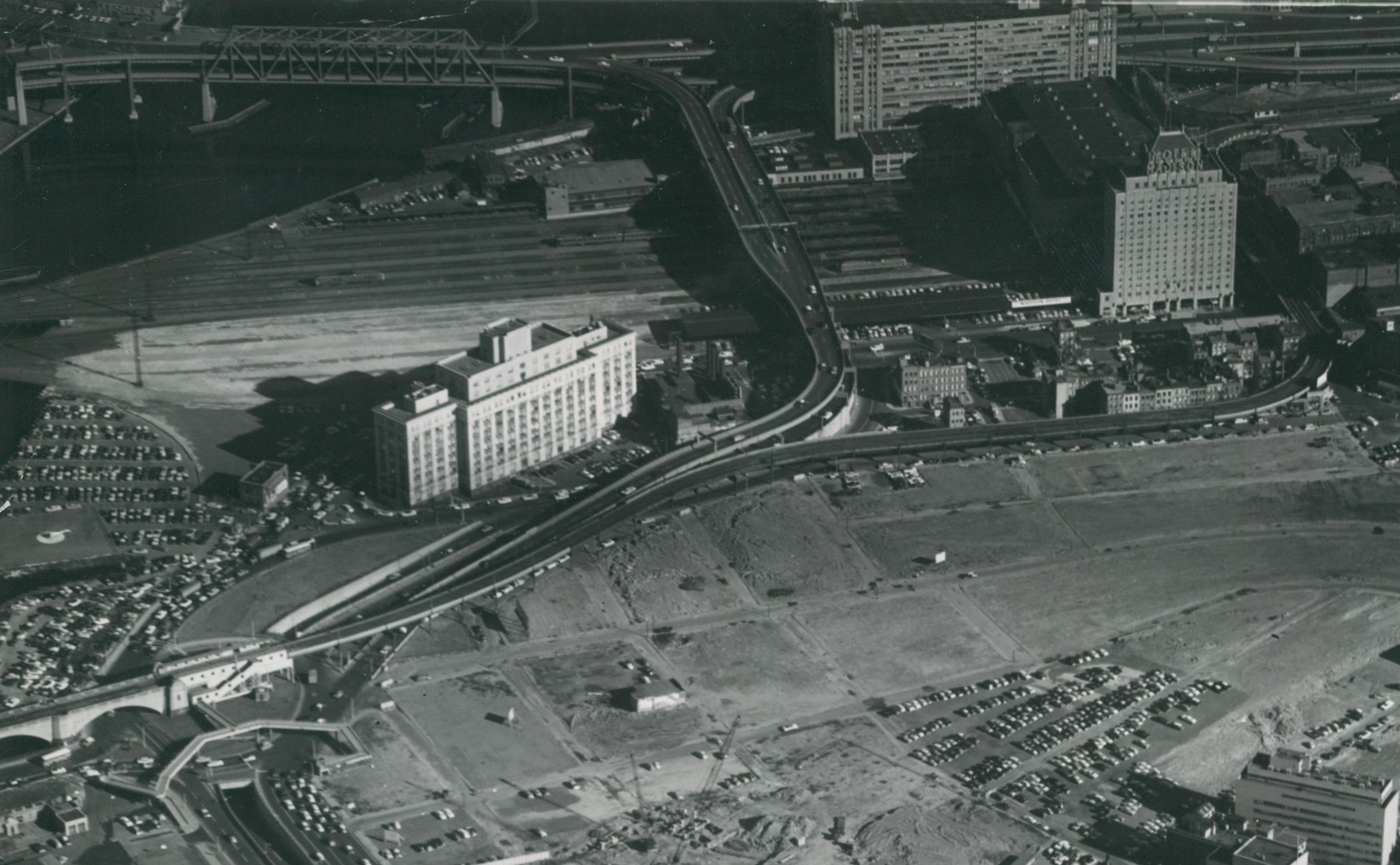
The Causeway Street elevated tracks in the early 1960s, with the Lechmere Viaduct at lower left and Hotel Madison and Boston Garden and North Station at upper right. The recently cleared land of the West End can also be seen.

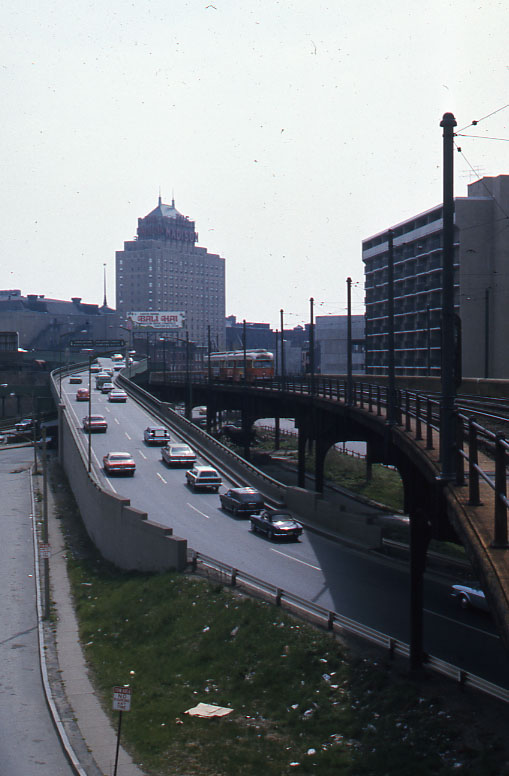
A Lechmere-bound PCC streetcar train on the Causeway Street elevated in May 1976, next to Central Artery ramps

=== Opening ===
When the Tremont Street subway fully opened in 1898, surface cars entering the subway from East Cambridge had to cross Craigie's Bridge and proceed on surface streets to the Canal Street incline. The trip from Lechmere Point over the bridge was slow and prone to heavy traffic delays. On June 20, 1907, construction began on one mile of elevated track connecting the Canal Street incline to East Cambridge. The project's centerpiece was the 1,700-foot (520 m) arched Lechmere Viaduct crossing the Charles River; other sections included a short elevated in East Cambridge and an elevated line above Causeway Street connecting the viaduct to the Canal Street incline. The first streetcars crossed the new bridge and the Causeway Street elevated in revenue service on June 1, 1912, shortening the ten-minute trip from Lechmere Square to the subway to just three minutes.

A single station was built on Causeway Street in front of the Boston and Maine Railroad's terminal, North Union Station, with connections to it as well as the Main Line Elevated station (which had opened in 1901) and the Causeway Street streetcar terminal (opened in 1898). An additional platform at the station was built for Main Line trains running shuttle services between North Union Station and South Station on the Atlantic Avenue Elevated. North Union Station was replaced in 1928 by North Station with the Boston Garden arena on top, prompting minor changes to the station's configuration.

When the Atlantic Avenue Elevated was closed in 1938, and subsequently demolished for scrap metal in 1942, the tracks that once served it were removed from the elevated station, but the abandoned stub trackbed remained part of the station for the remainder of its lifespan.

=== Closure ===
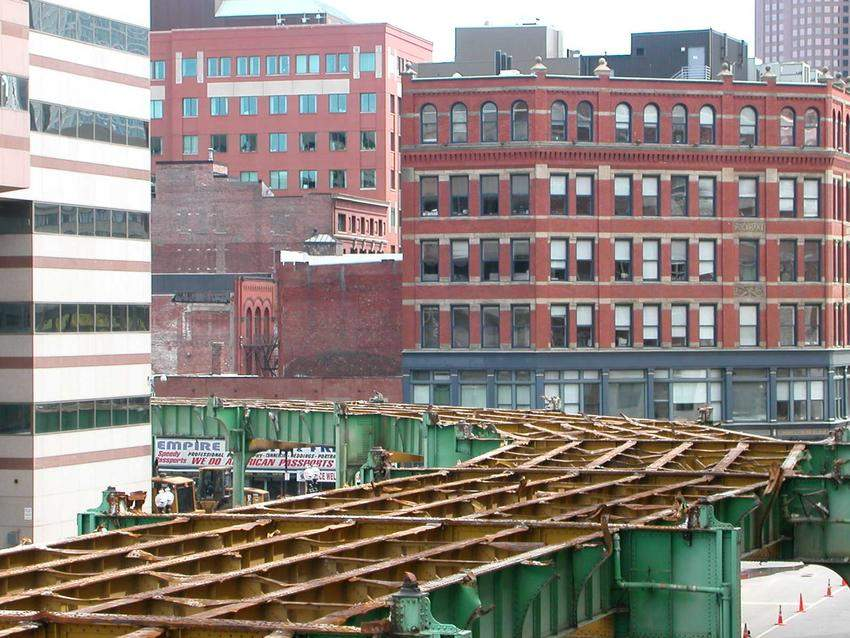
The Causeway Street elevated during deconstruction in September 2004

In 1995, Boston Garden was replaced by the FleetCenter (later renamed TD Garden), whose building was set further back from Causeway Street. Several years later, the Elevated was temporarily extended approximately 100 feet (30 m) east along Causeway Street, and the Causeway Street surface terminal closed on March 28, 1997, because Big Dig construction required several maintenance buildings to be constructed along the Elevated's original Causeway Street alignment. As part of environmental remediation to compensate for increased air pollution caused by the Big Dig, the Causeway Street elevated was replaced by a new tunnel under North Station to free up land and to lower noise levels associated with the trains' characteristic screech as they rounded the sharp elevated turns, as well as to remove the light-blocking elevated structure from Causeway Street. The new tunnel is 4 tracks wide under the North Station building. Through trains run on the outer tracks, while the inner two tracks are used for temporarily storing Green line cars and to reverse trains that terminate at North Station. A short siding off the inbound track south of North Station is used for storing construction equipment.

On June 25, 2004, the Causeway Street elevated was permanently closed. After a weekend of substitute bus service north of Government Center, Green Line service to the underground North Station "superstation" began on June 28. During the 2004 Democratic National Convention from July 24 to 29, 2004, the disused Elevated was used as a platform for security personnel. After a year of substitute bus service while the new portal and incline connecting the tunnel to the Lechmere Viaduct were finished, regular service to Lechmere resumed on November 12, 2005. The replacement of the Causeway Street elevated cost $310 million in 2005 dollars.
