= Haymarket station (MBTA) =

Subway station in Boston, Massachusetts, US

Haymarket
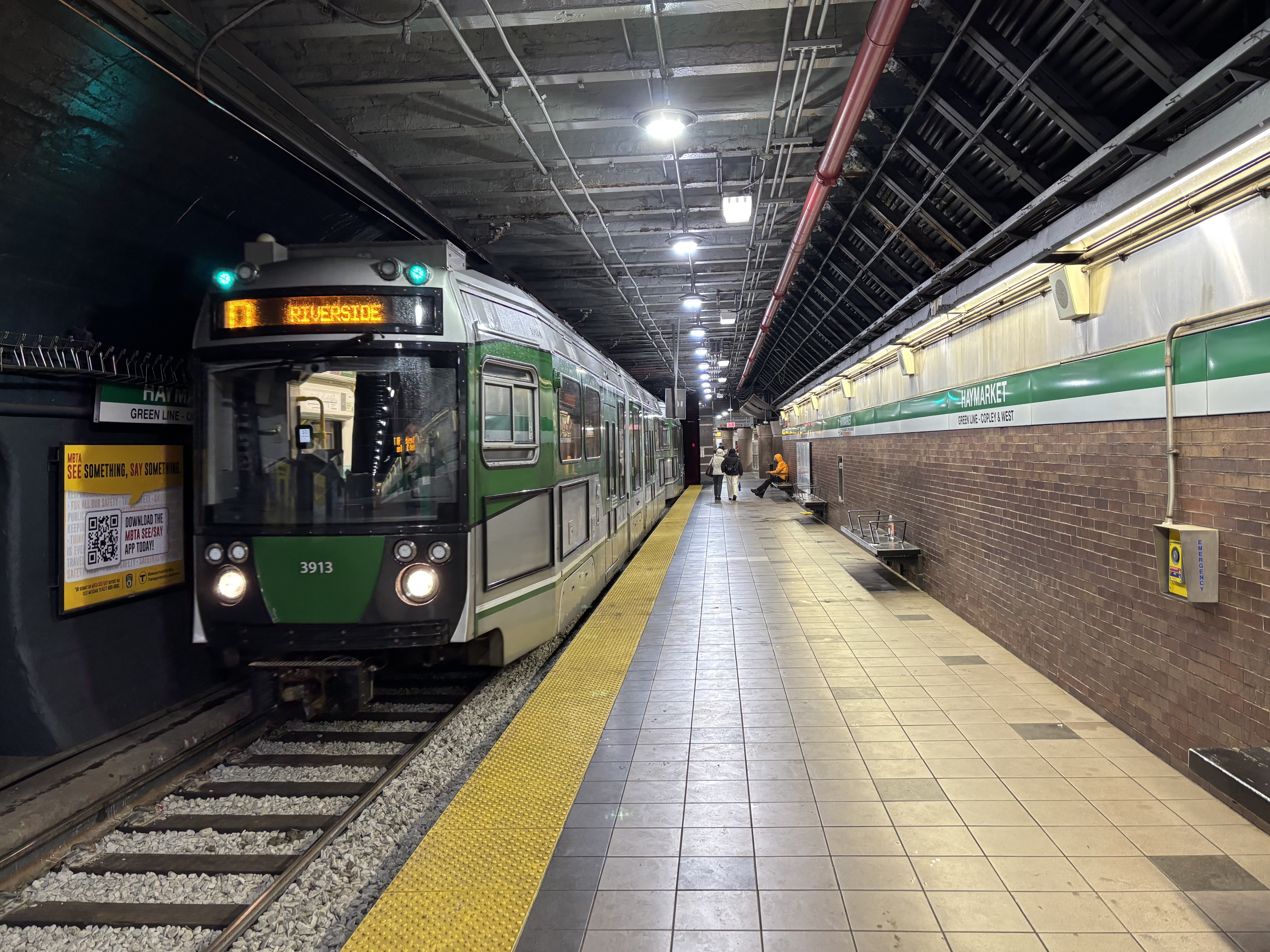
- A Riverside-bound Green Line train at the station in 2025

General information
- Location: Congress Street at Sudbury Street; Boston, Massachusetts
- Coordinates: 42.3623°N 71.0581°W
- Lines: Tremont Street subway; Washington Street Tunnel
- Platforms: 2 side platforms (Orange Line); 1 split island platform (Green Line)
- Tracks: 4 (2 for each line)
- Connections: MBTA bus: 4, 92, 93, 111, 354, 426, 428, 450

Construction
- Structure type: Underground
- Accessible: Yes

History
- Opened: September 3, 1898 (Green Line); November 30, 1908 (Orange Line)
- Rebuilt: May 10, 1971 (Green Line); 2000–2003
- Former names: Friend and Union (Orange Line)

Passengers
- FY2019: 10,597 (weekday average boardings)

Services
Preceding station	MBTA	Following station
Government Center toward Riverside	Green Line D branch	North Station toward Union Square
Government Center toward Heath Street	Green Line E branch	North Station toward Medford/Tufts
State toward Forest Hills	Orange Line	North Station toward Oak Grove
Former services
Preceding station	MBTA	Following station
Government Center toward Boston College	Green Line B branch Cut back in 2004	North Station Terminus
Government Center toward Cleveland Circle	Green Line C branch Cut back in 2021	North Station Terminus
Preceding station	Boston Elevated Railway	Following station
Scollay Square toward Dudley	Main Line Elevated 1901-1908	North Station toward Sullivan Square
Adams Square One-way operation	Main Line Elevated 1901-1908	North Station toward Sullivan Square
Location

Haymarket station is an underground Massachusetts Bay Transportation Authority (MBTA) rapid transit station located at Haymarket Square in downtown Boston, Massachusetts. It is a transfer station between the Green Line and Orange Line of the MBTA subway system, as well as a terminal for MBTA bus routes serving northern and northeastern suburbs. The two lines run parallel to each other through the station, with two side platforms for the Orange Line and a single island platform for the Green Line. The station is fully accessible.

The Tremont Street subway, predecessor of the modern Green Line, opened in 1898. It had a four-track streetcar station at Haymarket. The subway was also used by the Main Line, predecessor of the Orange Line, from 1901 to 1908. The Main Line was rerouted into the Washington Street tunnel, with Union and Friend stations at Haymarket Square, in 1908. Union and Friend were renamed Haymarket in 1967. In 1971, the MBTA replaced the original Haymarket station with a new station slightly to the south. Demolition of a parking garage caused several closures of the station in 2021–2023.

== Station layout ==
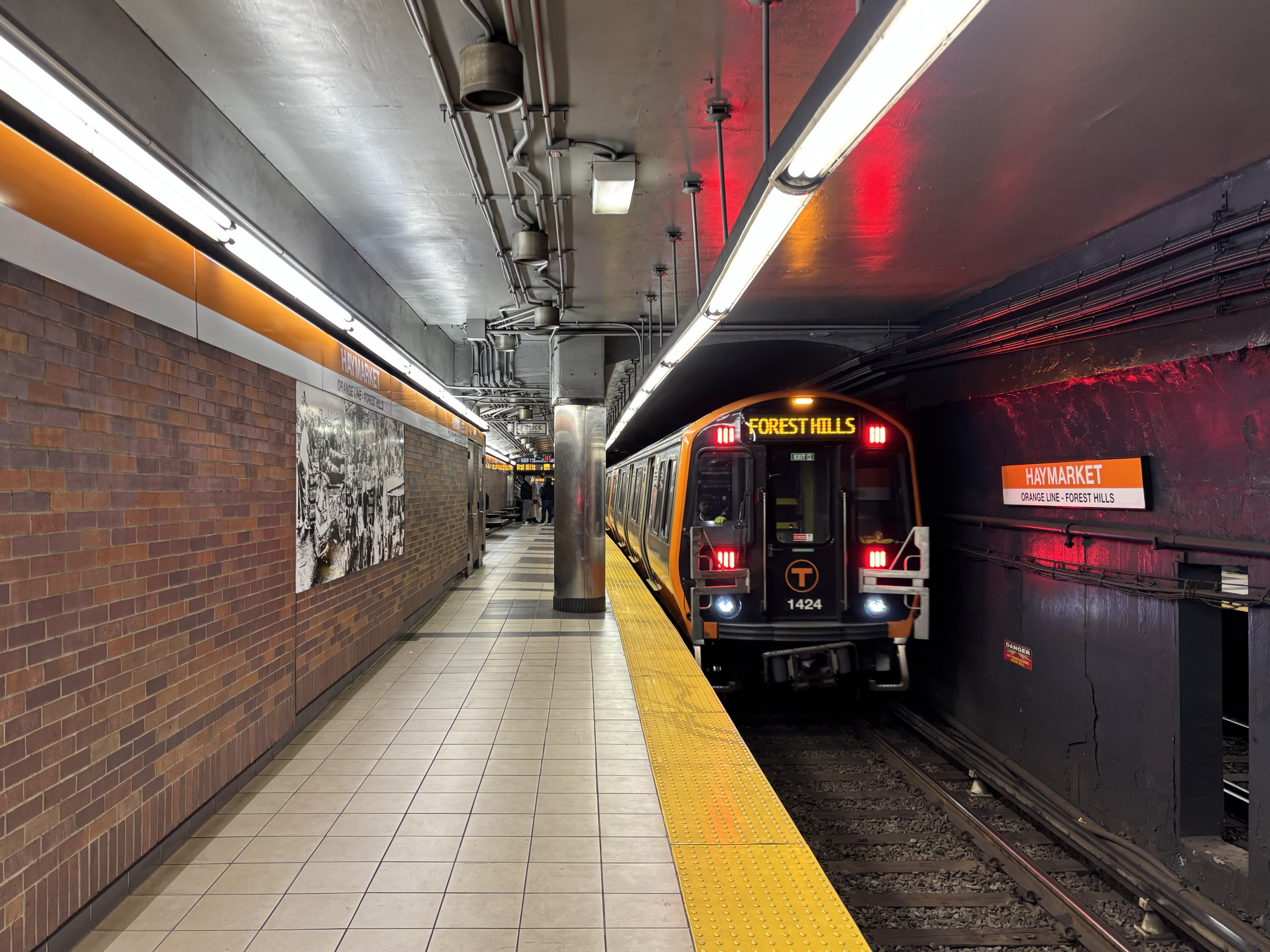
A southbound Orange Line train arriving at Haymarket station in 2025

Because the Washington Street Tunnel was built to replace the Tremont Street subway for Main Line Elevated use – and to share the Canal Street incline – the Green Line and Orange Line are parallel and approximately the same depth at Haymarket. The Green Line, to the west of the Orange Line, has two tracks serving an island platform divided in half by a wall. The Orange Line has two tracks serving two side platforms. A sub-passage at the north end of the platforms allows transfer between the two lines.

The two lines have separate primary entrances, although the sub-passage allows both lines to be reached from either entrance. The Green Line entrance is located north of Sudbury Street, under the east end of the Government Center Garage. The Green Line fare lobby is level with the platform. The Orange Line entrance is inside the Boston Public Market building south of Sudbury Street. A mezzanine level is between the street-level fare lobby and the platforms. Two elevators connect the Orange Line entrance to the two platforms, and another pair connect the platforms to the sub-passage. An elevator connects the Green Line entrance to the fare lobby, and the Green Line platform to the sub-passage.

Haymarket is a major bus transfer station, with a (presently closed) two-lane busway off Surface Road adjacent to the Green Line headhouse. It is served by eight MBTA bus routes – 4, 92, 93, 111, 354, 426, 428, and 450 – which include several local routes to Charlestown and Chelsea as well as express routes to northern suburbs and the North Shore. Haymarket is also the terminus for several early-morning round trips, which are extensions of routes that normally terminate at subway stations outside downtown. The trips are primarily intended for MBTA station agents, but are open to the public.

== History ==
=== Tremont Street subway ===
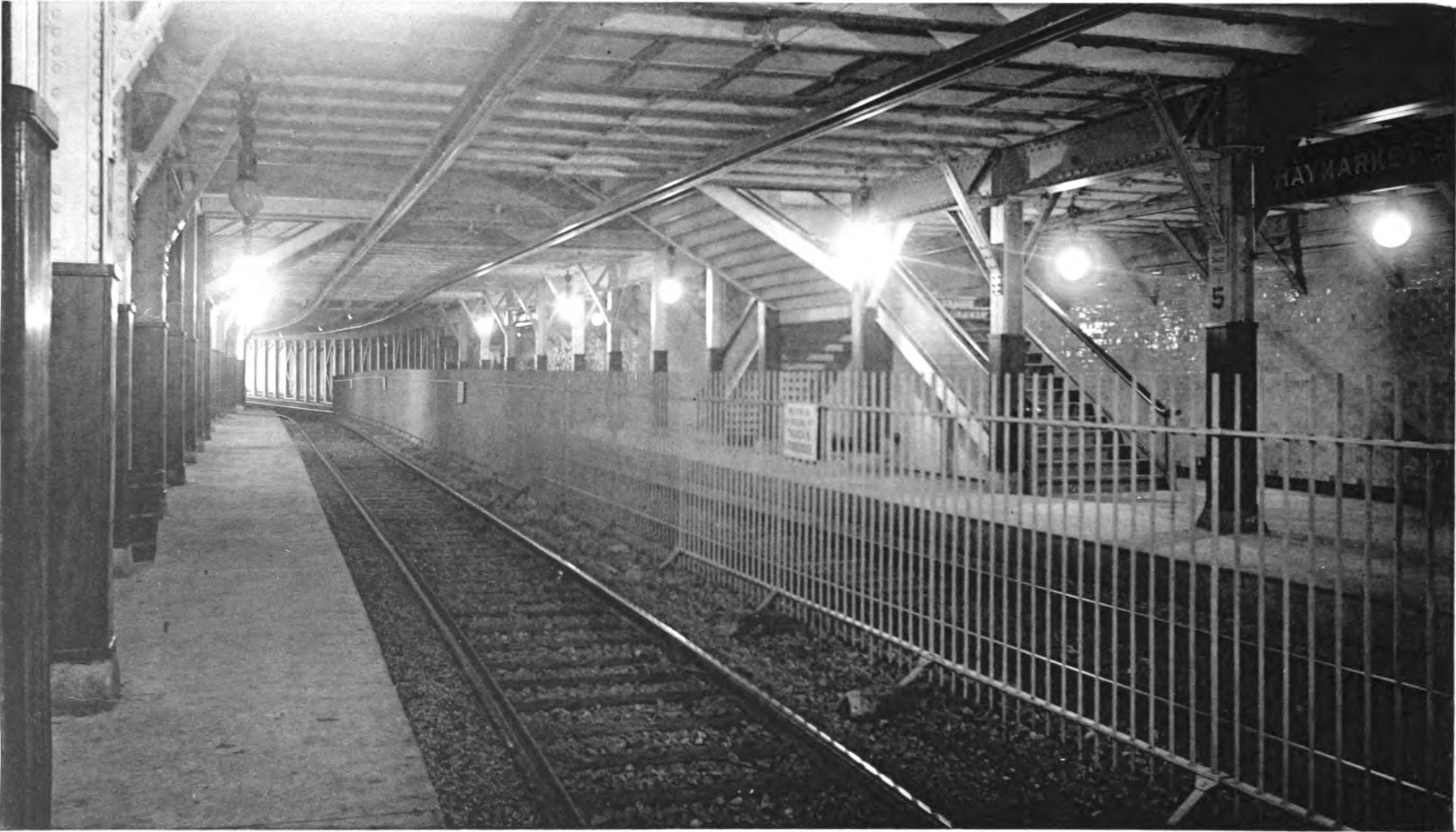
Inbound platform in 1898, looking outbound towards Canal Street incline; today's Green Line platforms are immediately south (inbound) of this location.

The Tremont Street subway (future Green Line), including Haymarket, was built starting in 1894 and opened on September 3, 1898. The original trolley station was larger than the current station and consisted of four tracks with a pair of island platforms. The inner pair of tracks served cars from the northern suburbs which turned at Brattle Loop at Scollay Square (now Government Center) station, while the outer tracks served streetcars that ran through the entire Tremont Street subway to the Public Gardens portal and Pleasant Street portal. All cars entered the subway through the Canal Street incline just north of Haymarket.

=== Main Line Elevated ===
On June 10, 1901, the Boston Elevated Railway's Main Line (future Orange Line) was opened from Sullivan Square to Dudley Square. The Tremont Street subway was retrofitted to allow operation of the Main Line elevated cars. Main Line trains from the Charlestown Elevated entered the tunnel through the outer tracks of the Canal Street portal and exited through the Pleasant Street portal to the Washington Street Elevated. Elevated cars ran on the outer tracks at Haymarket, served by temporary high platforms; streetcars continued to use the inner tracks, which connected to a turnback loop at Adams Square station.

On November 30, 1908, a new Washington Street Tunnel opened for use by Main Line trains, and the whole Tremont Street subway was returned to streetcar use. The Washington Street Tunnel ran separately from the Tremont Street subway; however, because both tunnels used the newly expanded Canal Street incline, the Main Line platforms at Haymarket Square were immediately adjacent to the Tremont Street subway. Like the other Washington Street Tunnel stations, the two Main Line platforms were named after nearby streets. The northbound platform was Union and the southbound platform Friend – collectively called, Union–Friend.

The track configuration at Haymarket after 1908 was similar to the original 1898 setup – the outer tracks served streetcars running through the subway, while the center tracks served cars turning at Brattle Loop at Scollay Square. The last (route #93) streetcars to use the inner tracks ran on July 2, 1949, although a North Station to Scollay Square shuttle ran until September 1952. After that, only emergency and special service cars used the inner tracks.

=== MBTA era ===
On October 28, 1963, the tunnel between Haymarket and the newly renamed Government Center station was realigned, and Adams Square station was closed. The outer tracks at Haymarket now connected directly to the through tracks at Government Center, while the center tracks connected to Brattle Loop. On January 26, 1967, Union and Friend platforms were officially renamed Haymarket.

On May 10, 1971, the MBTA opened a new Green Line platform at Haymarket, located south (inbound) of the 1898-built station. The new island platform occupies the space of the former center tracks, which were reconnected to the through tracks just south of the new platform. The original 1898 platforms are still visible in the tunnel from Green Line cars traveling just north of the new platforms. The empty space is now used for electrical equipment and occasional storage. A new entrance and busway under the Government Center Garage opened on December 20, 1971. In August 1975, the MBTA released plans to modernize four downtown stations, including the Orange Line platforms at Haymarket.

The Haymarket North Extension opened on April 7, 1975, replacing the Charlestown Elevated. North of Haymarket, the Orange Line tracks were redirected from the Canal Street incline into a new tunnel to North Station, and then under the Charles River. In June 2004, the Green Line was similarly rerouted, with the Canal Street incline closing entirely in favor of a tunnel to a newly rebuilt "superstation" at North Station. That facility allows convenient cross-platform transfers between the inbound Green and Orange Lines, as well as full outbound connections, lessening the importance of Haymarket as a rail transfer station. However, Haymarket station remains a major bus transfer station, served by many routes.

=== Renovations ===
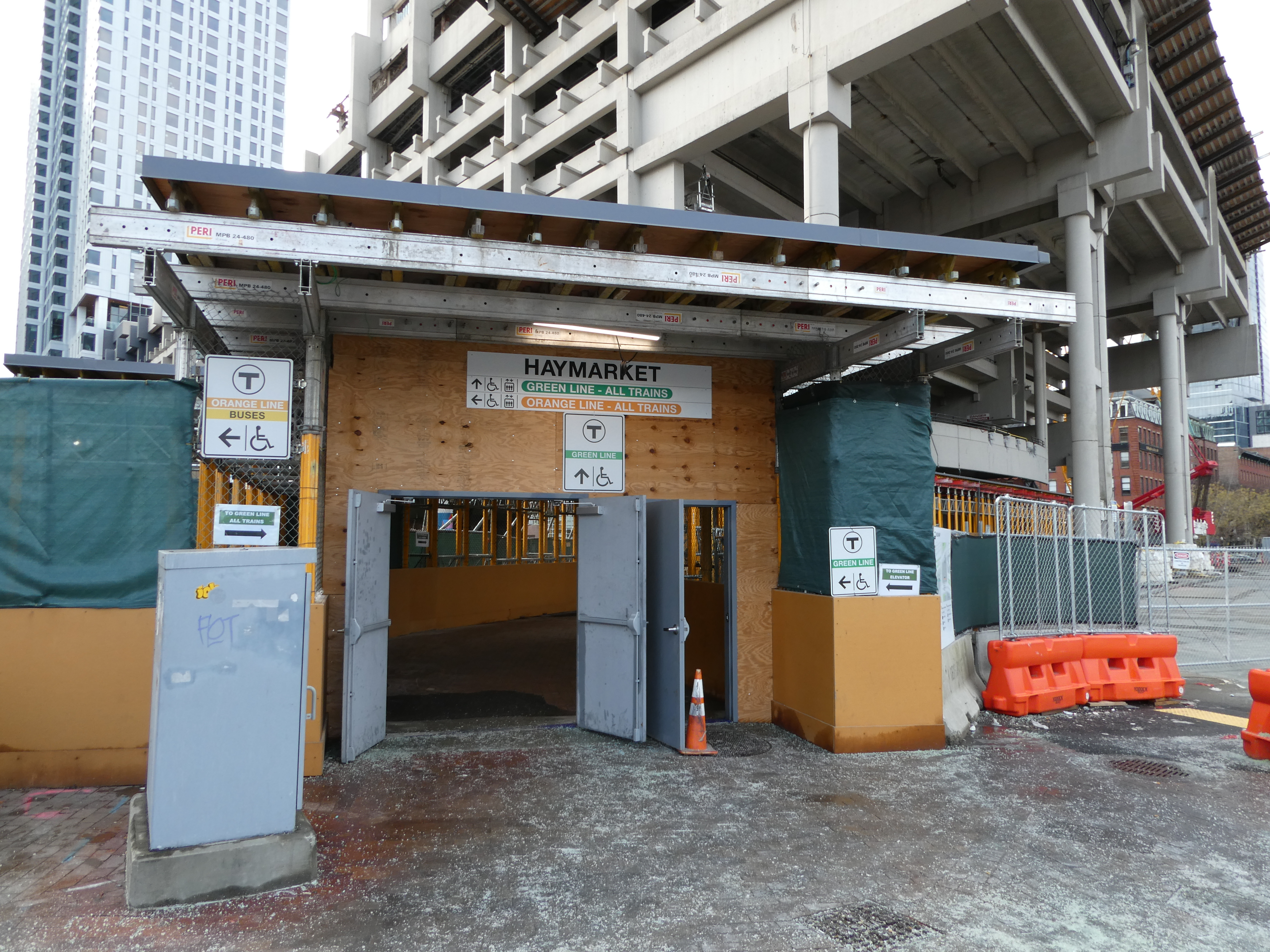
Temporary entrance during garage demolition

A 2000–01 renovation, part of the Parcel 7 construction, added elevators to all levels of Haymarket. This made the Orange Line accessible at the station. A $15 million project to build raised platforms at Park Street and Haymarket began in 2001 and was completed by 2003. On June 24, 2019, the MBTA Board awarded a $29.7 million, 16-month contract for full cleaning, wayfinding signage replacement, and other improvements at North Station, Haymarket, State, and Downtown Crossing stations. Much of the cosmetic work at Haymarket, including painting and floor repairs, was completed over the weekend of August 30–September 1, 2019. The work was completed in June 2021.

Part of the Bulfinch Crossing development will be built over the busway in the early 2020s; the project will include a modernization of the Green Line entrance and the busway. A temporary closure of the station during construction was originally considered; the developer later agreed to keep the station open, though temporary closures of the north headhouse may be needed. By February 2020, the section of the garage above the station was planned to be demolished in December 2020; however, this was delayed by the COVID-19 pandemic. The busway closed on June 28, 2021, with buses stopping on nearby streets. Demolition of the garage required several weekend closures of portions of the Green and Orange lines, as well as a weekend closure of just the station, in early 2022. Construction of the development and the new busway was expected to take 36 months.

After a portion of the garage collapsed on March 26, 2022, Orange Line and Green Line service through the station was temporarily suspended pending inspection of the tunnels. Orange Line service resumed on March 29, with trains bypassing Haymarket. After removal of about 100 short tons (91 t) of debris followed by tunnel inspection and testing, Green Line service resumed on April 9, with Haymarket station remaining closed for repairs to the standpipe system. The station reopened on April 10. The Orange and Green lines were again closed through Haymarket from June 23–26, 2022, after the discovery of a deteriorated garage support column.

The station was closed in August and September 2022 during overlapping closures of the Orange Line (August 19 to September 18) and the northern portion of the Green Line (August 22 to September 18). The closures allowed for maintenance work as well as further demolition of the garage. Weekend closures of the Orange and Green lines to accommodate garage construction continued into 2023. Green Line service was again suspended from September 18 to October 12, 2023, with Orange Line trains skipping Haymarket station during that closure. By April 2026, almost five years after the busway closure, no projected completion date was available.
