= Charlestown Elevated =

Former elevated railway in Greater Boston

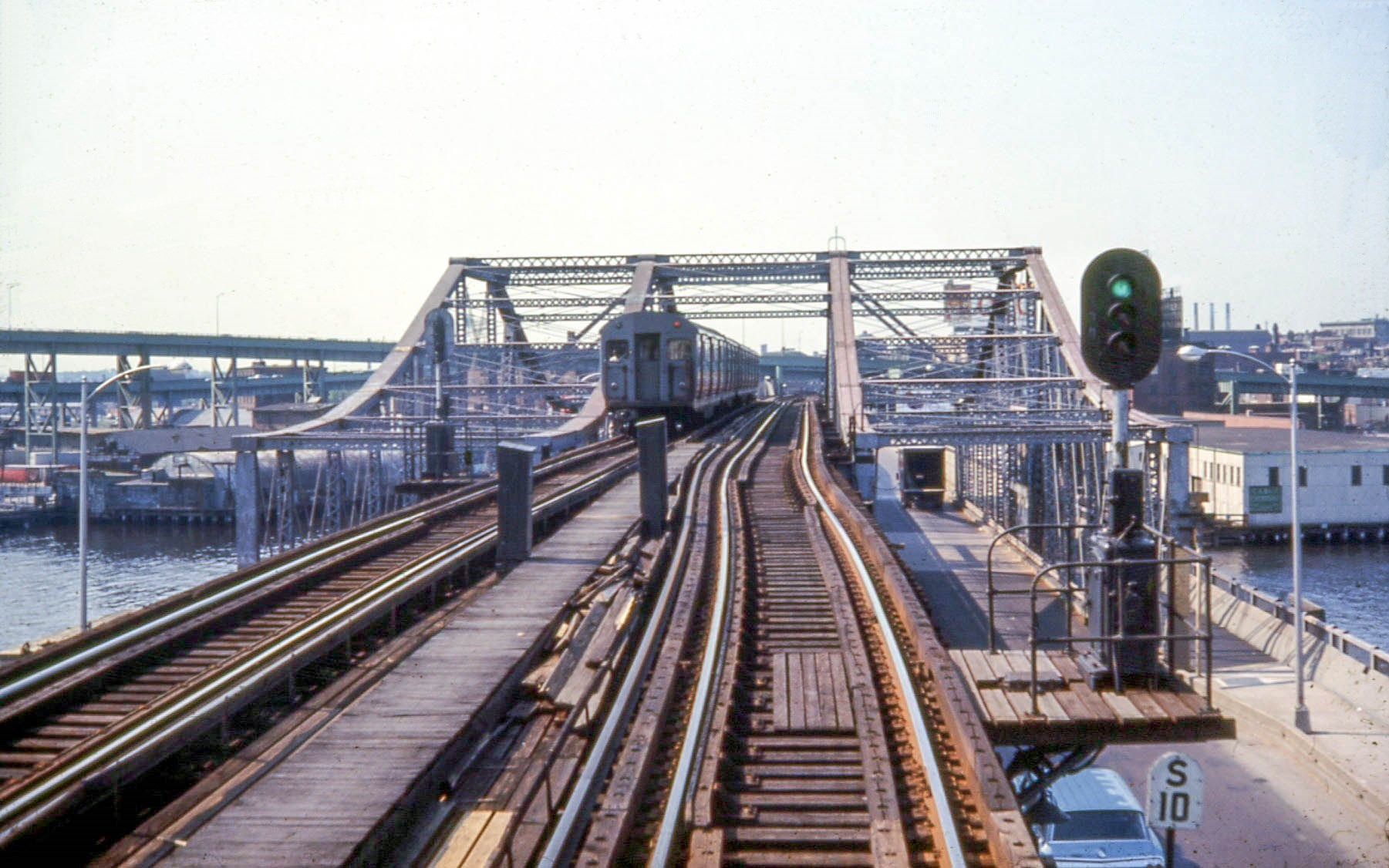
- An Orange Line train on the Charlestown Bridge in 1967

Overview
- Termini: Canal Street Incline; Everett station
- Stations: 5

Service
- System: BERy Main Line / MBTA Orange Line

History
- Opened: June 10, 1901
- Closed: April 4, 1975

Technical
- Number of tracks: 2
- Track gauge: 4 ft 8 1/2 in (1,435 mm)

The Charlestown Elevated was a segment of the MBTA subway's Orange Line that ran from the Canal Street Incline in downtown Boston, Massachusetts through Charlestown to a terminal in Everett, Massachusetts. It opened in June 1901 and was replaced by the Haymarket North Extension in April 1975.

== Route ==
The Charlestown Elevated began at the Canal Street incline, just north of Haymarket Square in the Bulfinch Triangle section of downtown Boston, Massachusetts. It paralleled the Causeway Street Elevated north to North Station just south of Boston Garden. There it turned east along Causeway Street to Tower C, the split with the Atlantic Avenue Elevated, then north over the Charlestown Bridge.

The Elevated turned slightly with an elevated station at City Square, then followed Main Street through Charlestown with a station at Thompson Square. Sullivan Square, the original terminal, was a grand arched brick building with multiple streetcar loops. The Sullivan Square Shops, one of the line's two maintenance facilities, was located just north of Sullivan Square. From there, the line turned northeast and crossed the Mystic River on a high bridge, then slowly descended to the ground-level Everett station.

== History ==
=== Construction ===
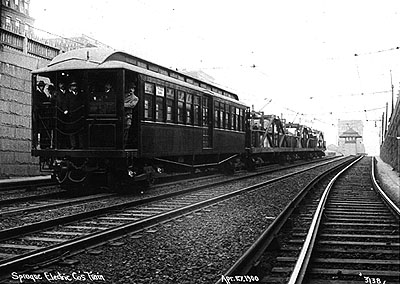
A test train on the Canal Street Incline in April 1900

Building of the elevated began in 1899 and it opened for revenue service on June 10, 1901. Stations were located at North Union Station (soon renamed as North Station), City Square, and Sullivan Square, with a major maintenance facility at Sullivan Square. The Atlantic Avenue Elevated opened on August 22, 1901, connecting to the Charlestown Elevated east of North Station. Thompson Square opened as an infill station between City Square and Sullivan Square on May 22, 1902.

When the Causeway Street Elevated was built in 1912, a platform was built at North Station for Atlantic Avenue Elevated shuttle trains so they would not block the main tracks. In 1917, the elevated was slated to be replaced with a more permanent subway line along the same Main Street routing, but this project was canceled by the US's entry into World War I.

=== Everett extension ===
In the 1910s and 1920s, the Boston Elevated Railway (BERy) had plans to extend the Charlestown Elevated to Malden, and the southern portion of this extension, including a drawbridge over the Mystic River, was built in the late 1910s. Everett station was opened in an isolated industrial area just north of the river crossing on March 15, 1919. Intended to be temporary and to be used only until full service to Malden was implemented, it was constructed of wood like a house rather than a permanent transit station. The light-duty construction style of this station was unique on the Elevated. Due to opposition from Malden residents who preferred a tunnel due to the noise and vibration of the planned elevated line, the Malden extension was not built and Everett remained the terminus.

The Atlantic Avenue Elevated operated only as a shuttle from South Station to the 1912-built North Station platform after 1928, and closed completely on September 30, 1938. It was demolished in 1942 to provide steel for the war effort, though a short section was left from Tower C for laying over trains from the Charlestown Elevated.

=== Replacement and closure ===
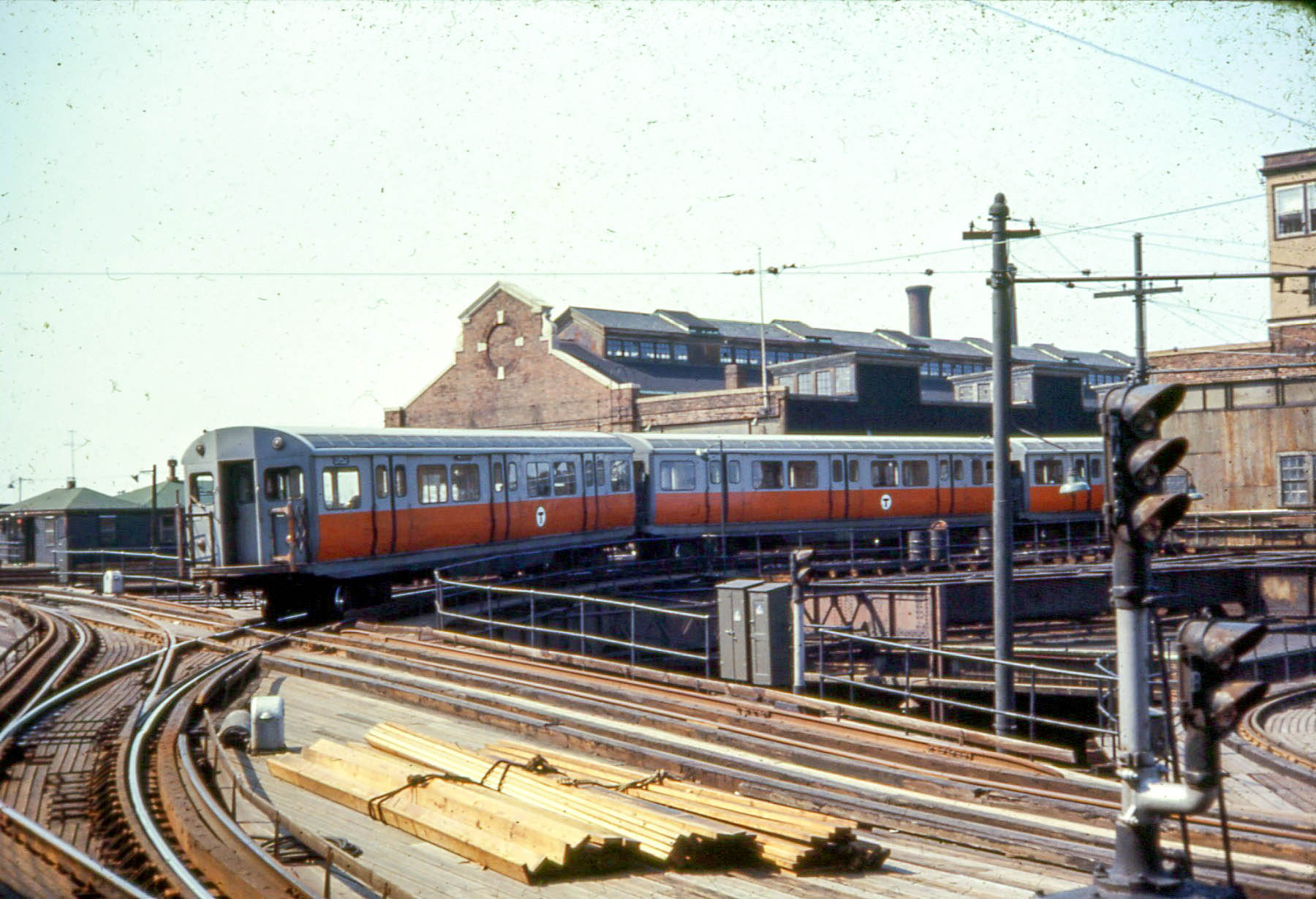
An Orange Line train at Sullivan Square Shops in 1967

Unlike the Washington Street Elevated, which was built at the same time with a similar design, the Charlestown El was located very near Boston Harbor and the Mystic River tidal estuary, and was thus continually exposed to accelerated corrosion caused by salt air. The elevated was also unpopular with many local residents, as it was noisy and blocked out sunlight to Main Street. In 1965, a promised removal of the elevated structure was part of a compromise deal by Edward J. Logue to secure local support of a planned redevelopment project.

A replacement elevated was thus infeasible, while a full-length replacement tunnel would have been too expensive. Instead, the Haymarket North Extension project consisted of a tunnel segment from Haymarket through a new underground stop at North Station, then under the Charles River to a portal near Bunker Hill Community College. From there the extension was built along the Haverhill Line commuter rail right of way, lowering land acquisition difficulties. The Charlestown Elevated was closed at the end of afternoon rush hour service on April 4, 1975, and the Haymarket North Extension opened on April 7.

A $387,000 contract to demolish the elevated was issued in June 1975, and demolition began that August at City Square. By the end of 1975, only North Station and Sullivan Square stations were standing in their original locations; they were demolished in 1976. Thompson Square station was lowered to the ground for restaurant use, but burned in 1976 before conversion could take place. The footings of the Mystic River bridge, just west of the Route 99 (Alford Street) road bridge, were not removed and remain extant. The elevated supports also remained in the center span of the Charlestown Bridge until it was replaced in 2020. Tower C, which was located at the split between the Charlestown Elevated and the Atlantic Avenue Elevated at the southern end of the Charlestown Bridge, was moved to the Seashore Trolley Museum.

== Station listing ==
City/Neighborhood	Station	Image	Notes
Boston	North Station		Second-floor connection to Boston Garden
Boston/Charlestown	City Square		
Boston/Charlestown	Thompson Square		
Boston/Charlestown	Sullivan Square		Replaced in 1975 by modern ground-level station
Everett	Everett		Terminus
