= Atlantic Avenue Elevated =

Railway line in Boston (1901–38)

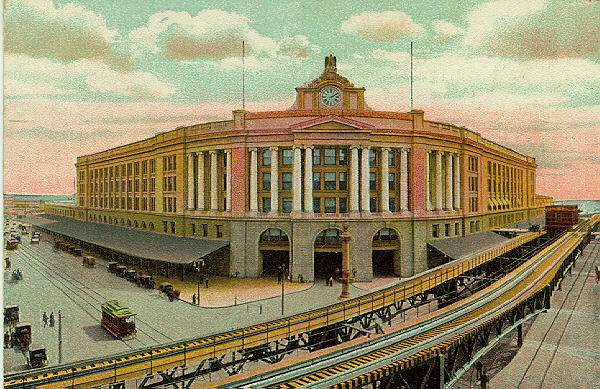
- The Atlantic Avenue Elevated outside South Station

Overview
- Termini: North Station; Tower D
- Stations: 6

Service
- System: Boston Elevated Railway

History
- Opened: 22 August 1901
- Closed: 30 September 1938

Technical
- Number of tracks: 2
- Track gauge: 4 ft 8 1/2 in (1,435 mm) standard gauge

The Atlantic Avenue Elevated was an elevated railway around the east side of Downtown Boston, Massachusetts, providing a second route for the Boston Elevated Railway's Main Line Elevated (now the MBTA's Orange Line) around the Washington Street tunnel. It was in use from 1901 to 1938, when it was closed due to low ridership, later being demolished.

== History ==
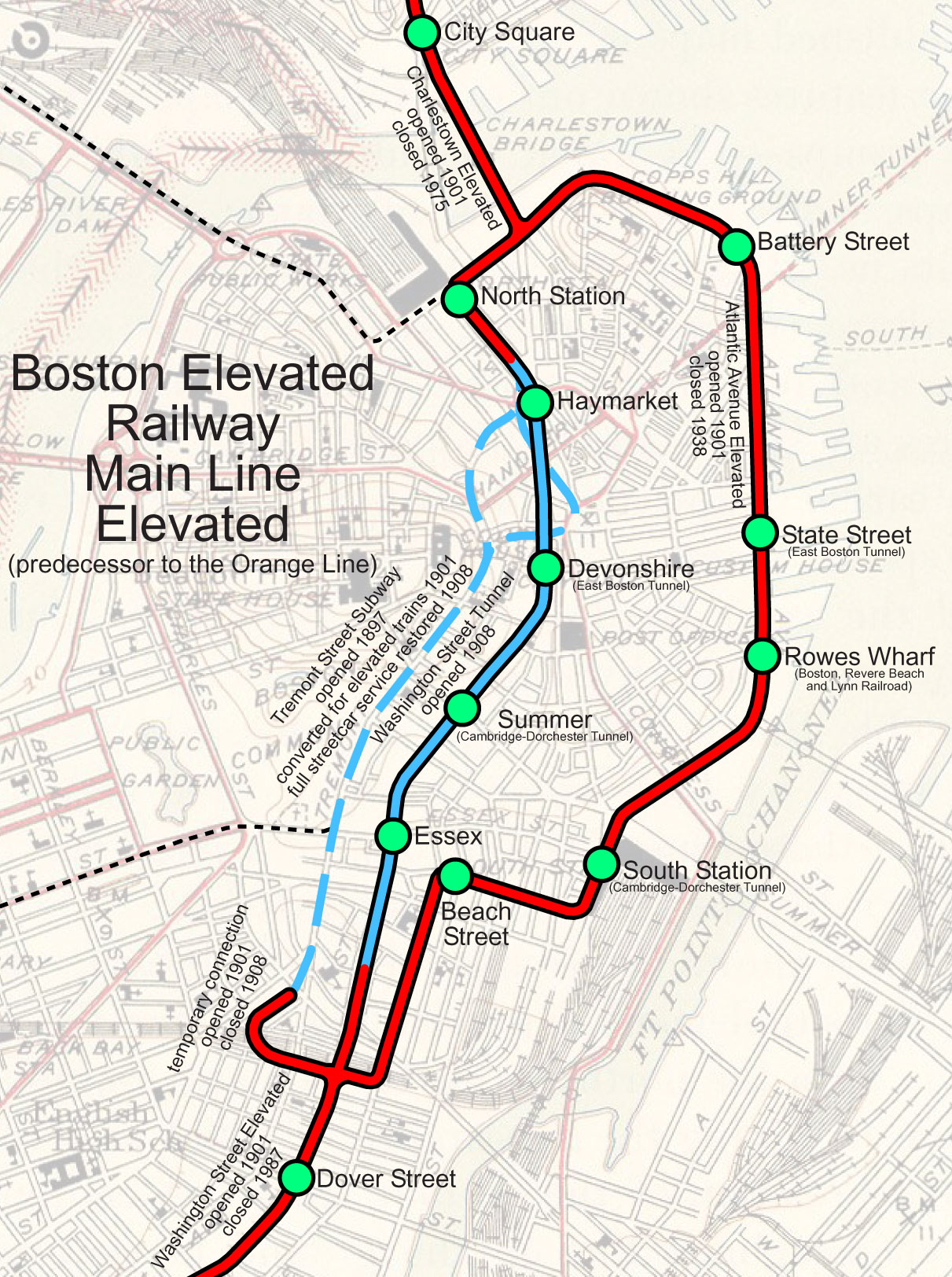
Map of the Atlantic Avenue Elevated (at right) and related lines

The Atlantic Avenue El was conceived as a part of a greater mass transit proposal by the Boston Transit Commission in 1896. After the success of the Tremont Street subway (now the Green Line) the Commission began looking at options for a unified system that would serve all of downtown Boston and reach out into the growing suburbs. As conceived, there would be two corridors through which elevated trains would run: the Washington Street tunnel – the heart of today's MBTA Orange Line subway – under Washington Street from a portal at Oak Street to the then-existing subway portal north of Haymarket Square, and an all-elevated line which would run along Atlantic Avenue. At the time, Atlantic Avenue was the heart of the fishing and maritime industries in Boston, and home to ferry terminals. Both the Washington Street subway and Atlantic Avenue El would service trains from the Main Line El (the elevated section of the old Orange Line, now demolished).

When the Atlantic Avenue El first opened – shortly after the Main Line itself – in August 1901, the Main Line went through the Tremont Street subway, changing between elevated and subway at the Pleasant Street incline (in the south) and the Canal Street incline (in the north). The low-level trolley platforms were altered with temporary high-level platforms to allow elevated trains to unload passengers. Where the original Washington Street Elevated (the south part of the Main Line) turned west from Washington Street onto Castle Street (now Herald Street), it had a full three-way junction (Tower D) with the Atlantic Avenue El, which began by heading east between Motte Street (also part of Herald Street) and the New York, New Haven and Hartford Railroad's approach tracks for South Station.

The El turned north after a block onto Harrison Avenue, continuing to Beach Street, where it turned east for its first station, Beach Street, on the block just east of Harrison Avenue. The El turned north on Atlantic Avenue, with its second station, South Station, located just north of East Street, with transfers to the South Station intercity and commuter terminal, and, beginning in 1916, to the Cambridge–Dorchester tunnel (now the Red Line). Next was Rowes Wharf, at Broad Street and High Street, with a transfer to the Boston, Revere Beach and Lynn Railroad via a ferry from Rowes Wharf to East Boston.

Continuing along Atlantic Avenue, the next station, at State Street, was named State Street, and had, beginning in 1904, a transfer to the East Boston tunnel (now the Blue Line). After merging with Commercial Street, Battery Street Station, just north of Battery Street, provided access to Boston's North End. Just south of Battery Street, on the east side, was the Boston Elevated Railway's Lincoln Wharf Power Station. At Keany Square, the Atlantic Avenue Elevated met the Charlestown Elevated, the north part of the Main Line, at a full three-way junction (Tower C), with the Charlestown El heading west on Causeway Street and into the subway, on the one hand, and north over the Charlestown Bridge, on the other. The Union Freight Railroad ran underneath the El on Atlantic Avenue and Commercial Street, carrying freight between the lines terminating in North Station and South Station.

In 1908, the Washington Street tunnel opened, rerouting the Main Line. At this time, the Tremont Street subway was switched back to streetcar-only service. As a consequence, the southern junction (Tower D) was reconfigured, with the Main Line heading north from it on the east side of Washington Street to the Oak Street incline into the tunnel.

=== Decline ===
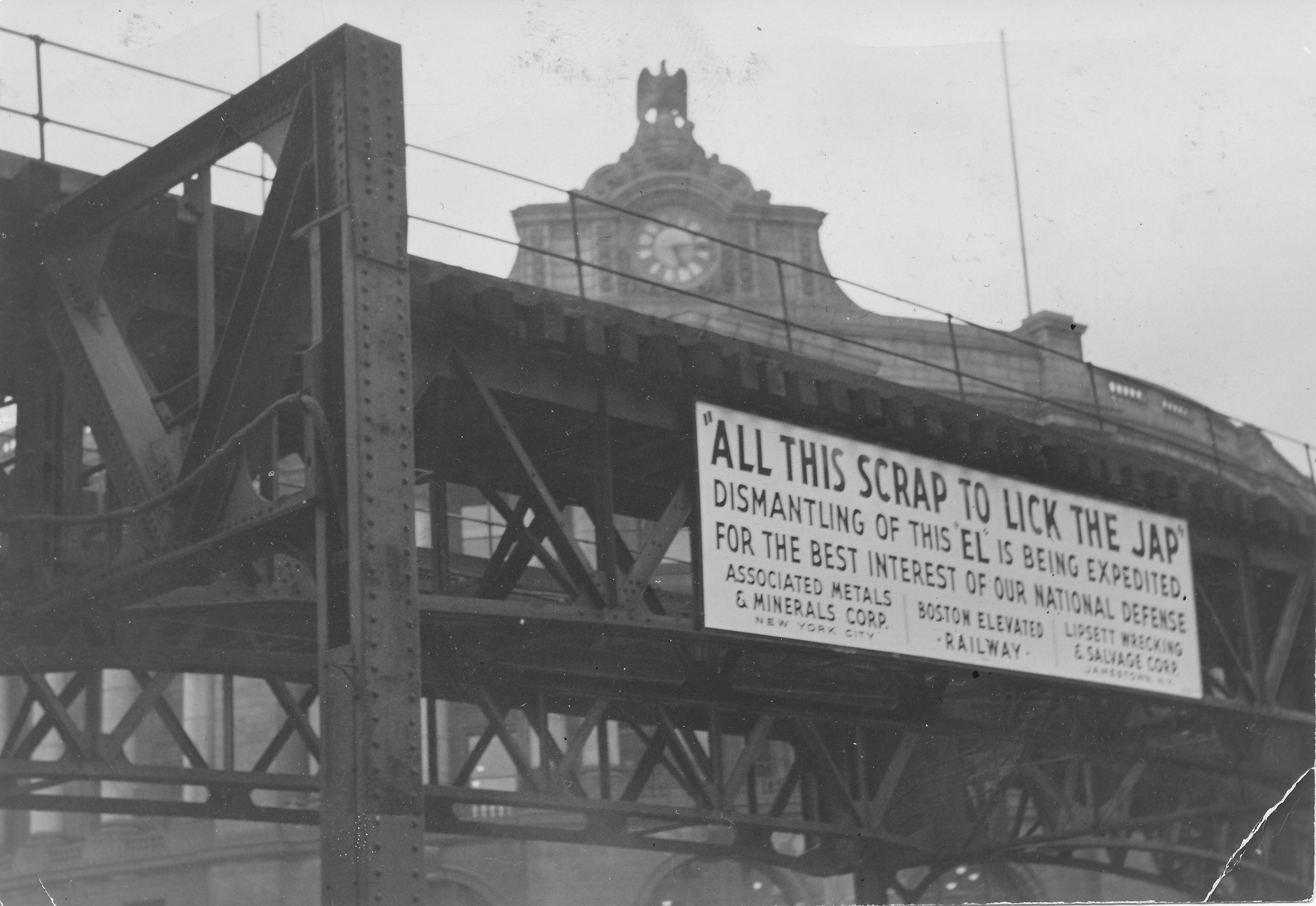
War-inspired slogan regarding the 1942 demolition

Service patterns originally included through service over the Main Line and additional Washington Street Elevated service looping via the tunnel one way and the El the other way. On January 4, 1919, the BERy increased service through the tunnel from three-minute to two-minute headways. Atlantic Avenue service was reduced to a North Station–South Station shuttle, with Beach Street station closed. On January 15, 1919, the Boston Molasses Disaster damaged the elevated structure north of Battery Street. Shuttle service resumed on March 29; Sullivan–Dudley service was added on June 14 but ended later in the year.

On December 6, 1919, the BERy began operating Dudley–South Station service, with trains running through the Washington Street Tunnel to North Station then over the Atlantic Avenue Elevated to South Station. Additional North Station–South Station shuttles were added on January 17, 1920. From 1920 to at least 1922, service from June to September was operated as Sullivan–Dudley to accommodate summer ferry ridership. Beginning in September 1922, regular service ran Dudley–North Station. On July 22, 1928, a northbound train derailed on the tight curve at Harrison and Beach due to excessive speed and crashed into the abandoned Beach Street station. Two passengers were killed in the wreck – the first time that passengers were killed in an accident on the Main Line Elevated. Regular service resumed on July 24.

Boston's waterfront lost importance during the 20th century. The 1904 opening of the East Boston tunnel cut heavily into East Boston ferry ridership, as did the 1934 opening of the Sumner Tunnel. Ferry ridership from elsewhere in Boston Harbor also declined sharply, and many maritime industries moved away from Atlantic Avenue. A 1926 state report on rapid transit expansion recommended the conversion of the Atlantic Avenue Elevated to an elevated highway. The last day of service on the Atlantic Avenue Elevated was September 30, 1938. It sat unused for several years and was torn down in 1942 for scrap metal for World War II. The Central Artery, an elevated highway, was built in the 1950s along Atlantic Avenue and was demolished in 2003 as part of the Big Dig.
