= Everett station (MBTA) =

Former rapid transit station in Boston, Massachusetts, US

Everett
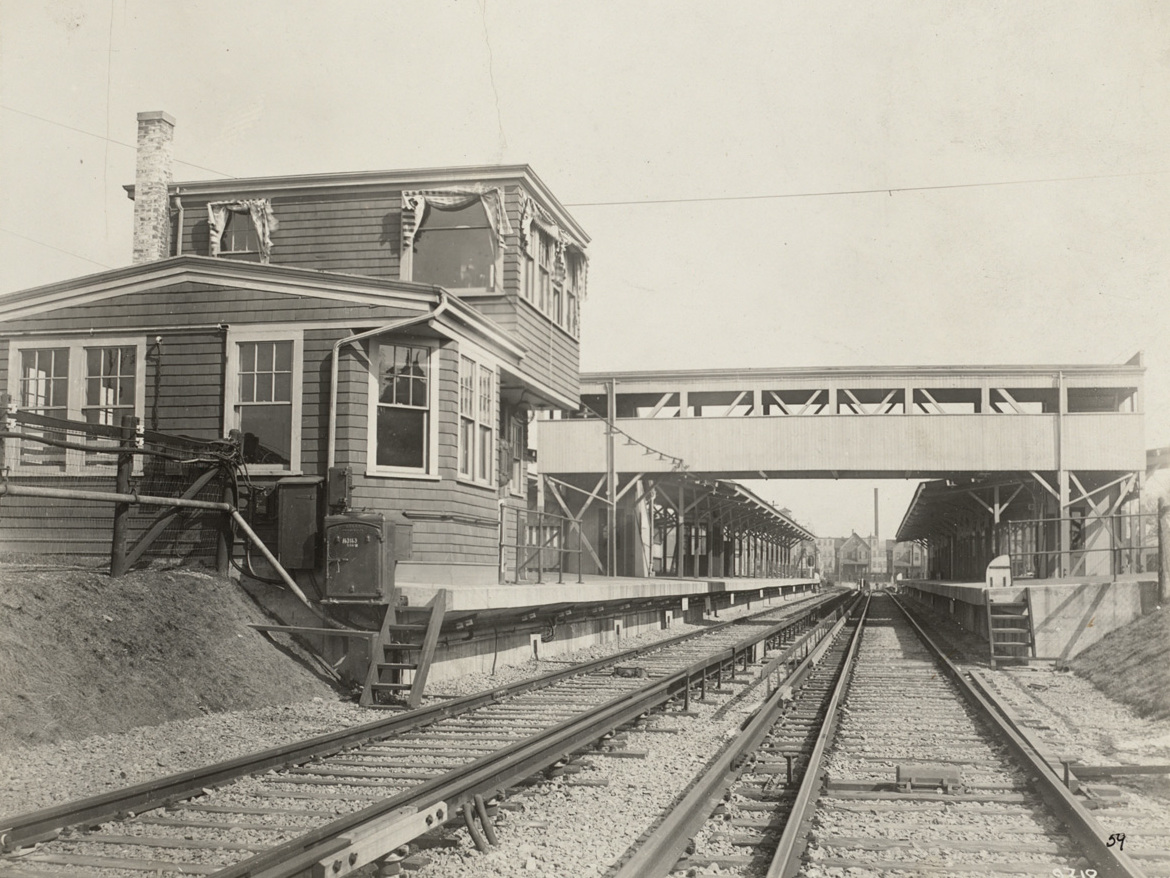
- Everett station in 1918, shortly before opening

General information
- Location: Broadway at Beacham Street, Everett, Massachusetts
- Coordinates: 42°23′52.39″N 71°3′52.85″W
- Owner: Massachusetts Bay Transportation Authority
- Line: Charlestown Elevated
- Platforms: 2
- Tracks: 2

History
- Opened: March 15, 1919
- Closed: April 4, 1975

Services
Preceding station	MBTA	Following station
Sullivan Square toward Forest Hills	Orange Line	Terminus
Location

Everett station was a rapid transit station in Everett, Massachusetts. It served the MBTA's Orange Line. It opened in 1919 as an extension of the Charlestown Elevated, and served as its northern terminus until the Elevated was closed and demolished in 1975, when it was replaced by the Haymarket North Extension.

== Construction and history ==
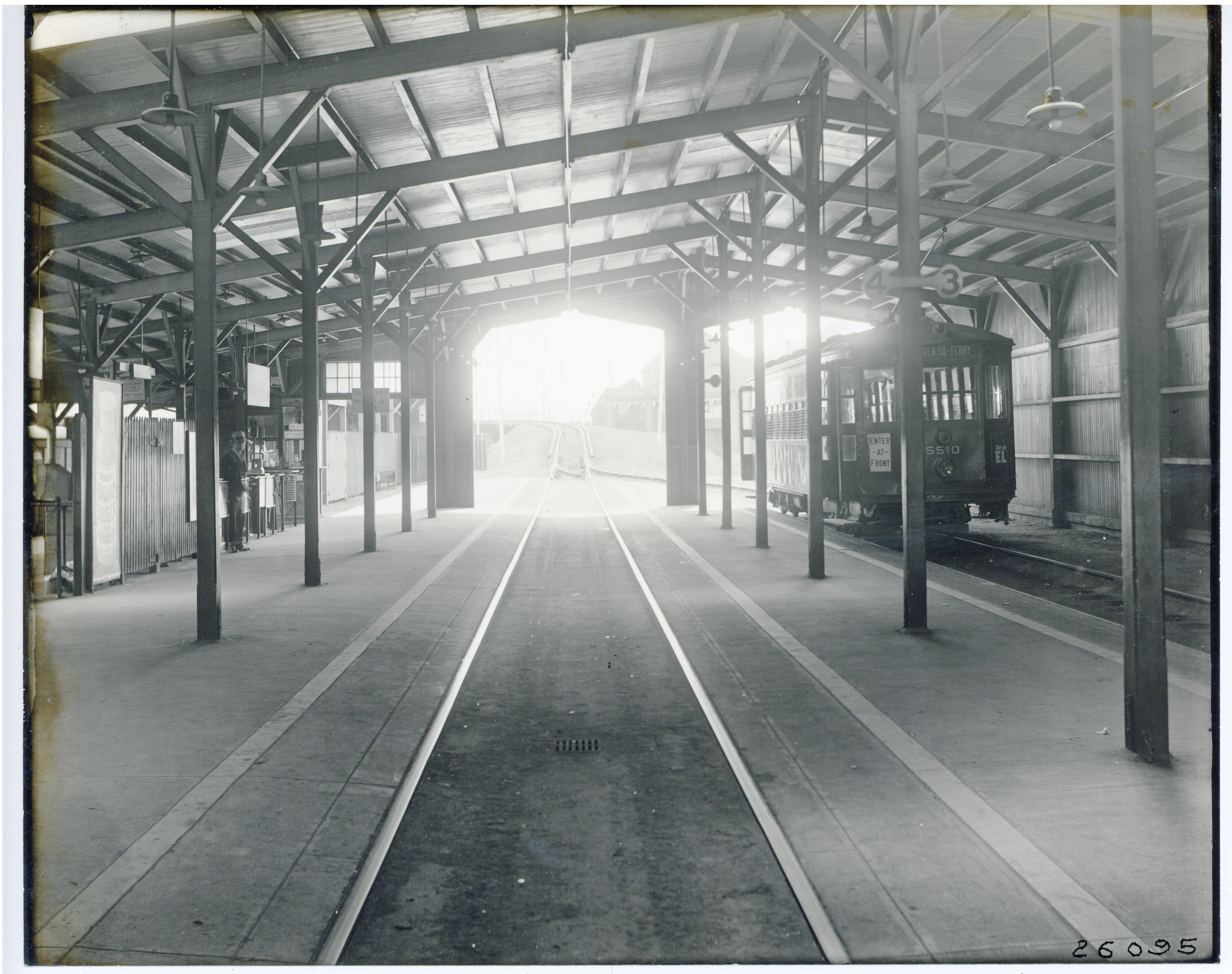
Streetcar platforms next to the inbound platform (not visible, at left) at Everett in 1931

In the 1910s and 1920s, the Boston Elevated Railway (BERy) had plans to extend the Charlestown Elevated to Malden via a new Main Street Elevated, but local opposition made that not happen. The southern portion of this extension, including a drawbridge over the Mystic River, was built in the late 1910s. Everett station was opened in an isolated industrial area just north of the river crossing on March 15, 1919.

Intended to be temporary and to be used only until full service to Malden was implemented, it was constructed of wood like a house rather than a permanent transit station. The light-duty construction style of this station was unique on the Elevated. Due to opposition from Malden residents who preferred a tunnel due to the noise and vibration of the planned elevated line, the Malden extension was not built and Everett remained the terminus. Although Everett thus became a semi-permanent station, it was never rebuilt from its "clapboard house" configuration, and began to look increasingly shabby as the years went by, acquiring a reputation to that effect among riders of the Elevated.

The MTA began charging for parking at its stations, including Everett, on November 2, 1953. On March 30, 1963, the remaining trackless trolley lines feeding into Everett were replaced with diesel buses. This allowed the somewhat isolated station to be closed on nights and Sundays to improve passenger security and comfort, during which times the buses were simply extended to Sullivan Square.

In the late 1960s and early 1970s, plans to reroute the Orange Line were implemented, culminating in the building of the Haymarket North Extension. The Haymarket North Extension rerouted the Orange Line into a new tunnel under the Charles River and from there followed the Haverhill Line north through Malden, somewhat to the west of the Charlestown Elevated's then-existing and previously-planned route. The Charlestown Elevated was closed on April 4, 1975, and the first section of the Haymarket North Extension was opened three days later. Since then, all transit service to the city of Everett has consisted of buses terminating at Sullivan Square, Wellington, Malden Center, or Wood Island stations.
