= Canal Street incline =

Former subway portal in Boston, Massachusetts

Coordinates: 42.364234°N 71.059352°W

The Canal Street incline (also Canal Street portal) was a ramp connecting two transit tunnels in Boston with surface and elevated lines. It was located in the Bulfinch Triangle between North Station and Haymarket Square in two blocks bounded by Canal Street to the west, Causeway Street to the north, Haverhill Street to the east, and Market Street to the south. The incline was the north end of the Tremont Street subway (which became the center of the MBTA Green Line) and the Washington Street Tunnel (which became the Orange Line). Built in 1898, it remained in use until 2004 when the last connecting line was moved underground.

== History ==
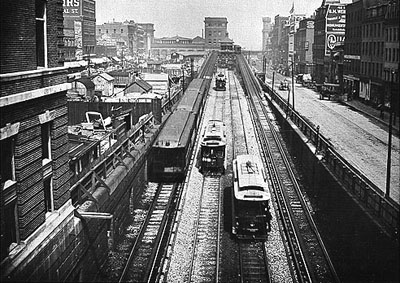
Looking north up the incline in 1901, with rapid transit to the Charlestown Elevated on the outer tracks.

During planning of the Tremont Street subway in the 1890s, various configurations were considered for the north end of the tunnel. All designs included an incline to the surface to serve streetcars from Charlestown and Cambridge, plus a surface or underground terminal for streetcars from the tunnel. (The blocks between these streets had formerly been occupied by the tracks leading to the Boston and Maine Railroad's Haymarket Square terminal, which was closed in 1893 by the construction of North Union Station.) The Boston Transit Commission constructed a four-track incline; the inner tracks would lead to the surface, and the outer tracks would serve a planned underground loop station (which was later replaced with a surface terminal).

This four-track incline opened on September 3, 1898, as part of the final section of the Tremont Street subway. On June 10, 1901, the two outer tracks were connected to the newly opened Charlestown Elevated; only the inner tracks carried streetcars. By this time, a pedestrian tunnel crossed under the incline at Traverse Street, which had been severed by its construction. On November 30, 1908, the Washington Street Tunnel opened; it was connected to the Charlestown Elevated using the two eastern tracks of the incline. The incline was expanded west for two additional tracks, restoring four-track streetcar operations through the subway.

On June 1, 1912, the Causeway Street elevated (which led to the Lechmere Viaduct) was connected to the outer tracks at the incline. After route 93 was converted to bus on July 1, 1949, the center streetcar tracks were only used by streetcars terminating at North Station. The Charlestown Elevated was closed on April 4, 1975, and the eastern two tracks of the incline were removed. The Haymarket North Extension, which opened on April 7, included a new tunnel and an underground North Station.

The Causeway Street terminal was closed on March 28, 1997, for construction of a new Green Line tunnel. The tracks to the Causeway Street elevated were shifted east onto the 1975-abandoned part of the incline, and a temporary elevated structure was built over Haverhill Street. Service over this structure ended on June 25, 2004; service to the new underground North Station "superstation" began on June 28. A new incline at Martha Road some 1,600 feet (490 m) to the northwest, which connects the extended tunnel to the Lechmere Viaduct, opened on November 12, 2005. The former Canal Street incline site was soon covered by commercial development.
