= Haymarket North Extension =

Section of the MBTA Orange Line

The Haymarket North Extension is a section of the MBTA subway's Orange Line in Greater Boston, Massachusetts, currently constituting the northern section of the line. It runs from North Station through an underground crossing of the Charles River (with the 2003-completed Leonard Zakim Bridge later built directly over it), then along the Haverhill Line right-of-way to Oak Grove station in Malden, Massachusetts. Built to replace the Charlestown Elevated and originally intended to be extended as far as Reading, it opened in stages between 1975 and 1977.

== Route ==
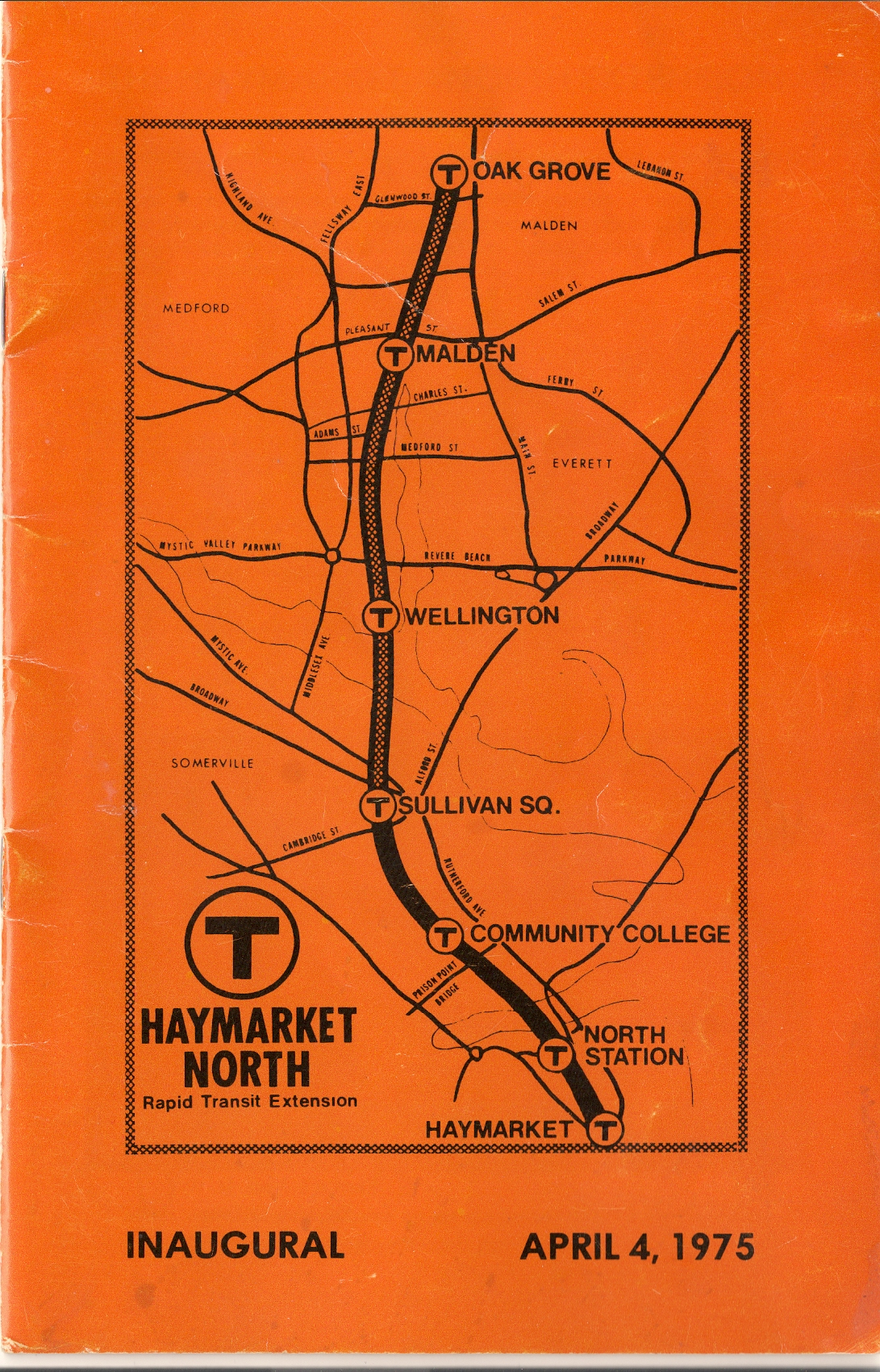
Flier from the inaugural run of the first section in April 1975

The Haymarket North Extension begins just north of Haymarket station in Boston, with an underground station at North Station. The tunnel runs under the Charles River, surfacing in Charlestown just south of Community College station. The extension runs on the surface under the elevated Interstate 93 highway and crosses the Haverhill Line and Newburyport/Rockport Line on a flyover, touching down at Sullivan Square station. From Sulivan Square north, the extension runs on the west side of the Haverhill Line tracks. It continues on the surface to Assembly station in Somerville and crosses the Edward Dana Bridge over the Mystic River to Wellington station. North of Wellington, the line ducks into a short tunnel under the former Medford Branch, then rises onto an embankment as it enters Malden. The elevated Malden Center station is also served by the Haverhill Line. The line continues north at surface level to the terminal at Oak Grove station.

Sullivan Square, Wellington, and Malden Center are major bus terminals for the northern suburbs, serving MBTA bus routes from as far as Woburn, Reading, and Saugus.

=== Station listing ===
Station	Opening date	Notes
Oak Grove	March 19, 1977	Transfer to Haverhill Line
Malden Center	December 27, 1975	Transfer to Haverhill Line
Wellington	September 6, 1975	
Assembly	September 2, 2014	Infill station (not part of original extension)
Sullivan Square	April 7, 1975	Different location from elevated station it replaced
Community College	April 7, 1975	
North Station	April 7, 1975	Replaced elevated station; rebuilt in 2005 as an underground "superstation" with transfers to the Green Line

=== Architecture ===
Like the stations of the South Shore Line (the Braintree branch of the Red Line), built in the same period, the original Haymarket North Extension stations were constructed in a Brutalist style, with angular concrete forms. Community College and Sullivan Square, enclosed under the I-93 viaduct, are primarily rectilinear forms; the later stations incorporate angled forms for staircases and elevators as well.

== History ==
=== Planning ===
Unlike the Washington Street Elevated (which was built at the same time and with a similar design), the Charlestown El was located very near Boston Harbor and the Mystic River tidal estuary, and was thus continually exposed to accelerated corrosion caused by salt air. The elevated was also unpopular with many local residents, as it was noisy and blocked out sunlight to Main Street. In 1965, a promised removal of the elevated structure was part of a compromise deal by Edward J. Logue to secure local support of a planned redevelopment project. With an elevated line thus politically infeasible, and a full-length tunnel too expensive, the project was designed to use existing Boston and Maine Railroad (B&M) rights-of-way with limited tunneling. A groundbreaking was held on September 22, 1966. After debate about how far the extension would run, it was decided that it would terminate at the north edge of development in Malden, rather than continue through a narrow pass between the Middlesex Fells and the Pine Banks and into the less-dense suburbs of Melrose and Wakefield.

In 1970, the MBTA made plans to develop a dual-mode diesel-electric railcar that could use the existing commuter rail tracks north of Oak Grove to allow through service between Boston and Reading. These BIPED (bi-powered equipment development) cars were intended to also be usable on other routes, including on the Fitchburg Line past Alewife and on South Shore routes past Braintree. The plan was soon quashed by the state Department of Public Utilities, which objected to the safety risks of an electrical issue igniting diesel fuel in the downtown tunnels.

=== Construction ===
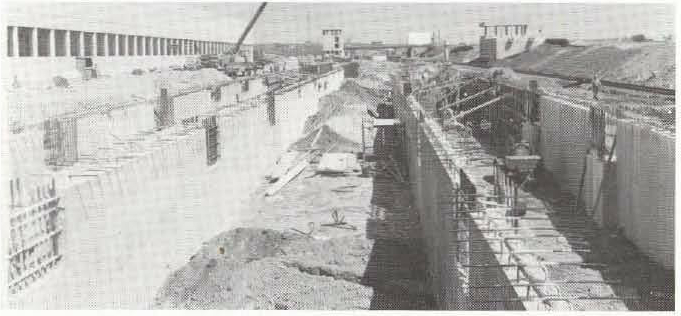
Wellington station under construction

The tunnel under the Charles River was constructed as an immersed tube, with steel tunnel segments sunk into a trench and filled with concrete using a tremie. The tunnel sections on land were built using the cut-and-cover method; they consist of a 24-by-34-foot (7.3 m × 10.4 m) reinforced concrete box some 3–3.5 feet (0.91–1.07 m) thick. Transition sections, 70 feet (21 m) long with 4-foot (1.2 m)-thick walls, connect the land and underwater segments. Construction of the Boston end of the tunnel unexpectedly required underpinning of North Station, an adjacent industrial building, and the Central Artery/Leverett Circle highway bridge.

The Edward Dana Bridge (named for the former BERy and MTA general manager) over the Mystic River cost $9.1 million alone. It is essentially two parallel bridges, one with three rapid transit tracks and the other with a single commuter rail/freight track. The platforms were built to handle trains of six 65-foot (20 m)-long cars, rather than the existing trains of four 50-foot (15 m) cars; after modifications to other stations, six-car trains began operation in 1987.

The Charlestown Elevated closed on April 4, 1975, and the new segment from Haymarket to Sullivan opened on April 7. This segment was a direct replacement for the El: North Station and Sullivan replaced nearby elevated stations, while Community College roughly replaced the former City Square and Thompson Square stations. The next section, from Sullivan over the new Edward Dana Bridge to Wellington, opened on September 6, 1975. The Wellington Shops for railcar maintenance, which replaced the Sullivan Square Shops and later the Forest Hills Shops, were opened with this extension. An additional segment to the elevated Malden Center, which includes a platform for the Haverhill Line, opened on December 27, 1975. The sixth and terminal station, Oak Grove, opened on March 19, 1977.

The speed and cost of the project proved controversial. Opening the first segment to Sullivan Square took 8 1/2 years – twice as long as expected – and the $180 million cost was over double original estimates. In March 1975, governor Michael Dukakis commented "My kids could build that thing out to Melrose. I don't comprehend it." MBTA officials blamed three factors for the delays and rising costs. The B&M refused to allow full construction access until the MBTA spent $18 million to purchase the Western Route from Somerville to Wilmington – a transaction not completed until September 1973 – and numerous B&M mainline and yard tracks had to be relocated. The underpinning of buildings for the tunnel construction, and difficulties with the engineering firm that designed the project, were also blamed.

==== Reading plans and third track ====
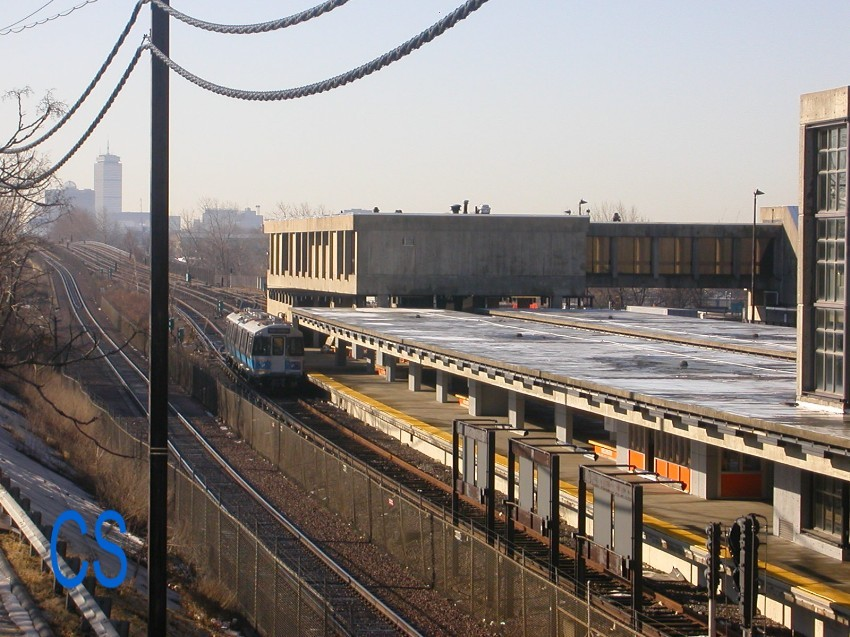
A Blue Line test train on the third track at Wellington in 2007

The extension was originally planned to continue further north to Reading and replace commuter rail service entirely between Boston and Reading. Under that plan, without commuter tracks between Boston and Reading, all Haverhill trains would have continued to use the Lowell Line and Wildcat Branch. That routing was used for all Haverhill service between 1959 and its termination in 1976. (When Haverhill service returned in 1979, it was routed via Reading; only a handful of rush hour trains, plus Amtrak's Downeaster service, still use the Wildcat Branch.)

A third express track was built as part of the extension; it would have been extended north to provide express service to Reading. The 2.25 miles (3.62 km) actually built run from just south of Community College to just north of Wellington. The engineering design firm insisted on the third track as a necessary futureproofing, but some officials accused the firm of using it to increase the project cost to increase their consulting fee. In September 1972, the MBTA announced the previously private decision that due to a lack of immediate funding to continue the line past Oak Grove, express service would not be run, as the time savings from Malden would be limited and the third track space through Malden was needed for commuter rail. In 1982, a General Accounting Office report criticized the MBTA for spending $2.3 million in federal funds on the third track, though the MBTA argued that the inability to run express service was due to political forces beyond MBTA control.

The third track is occasionally used for other purposes like testing new equipment and rerouting trains during extreme weather conditions. In 2007, it was used to test new Blue Line cars. During the Assembly station project, outbound trains were shifted to the third track and inbound trains to the normal outbound track to allow construction work on the station.

=== Assembly station ===
In the early 2000s, Somerville began planning the Assembly Square development, built on the abandoned site of the former Somerville Assembly automobile plant. A key piece of the development was an infill station at the site between Sullivan Square and Wellington to reduce the number of car trips generated. After two years of construction, Assembly station opened on September 2, 2014. It was the first fully new station on the MBTA subway system since 1987, and the first infill station since Quincy Adams in 1983. Assembly station has an island platform between the two main tracks; during construction, outbound trains were diverted onto the normally-unused third track, and inbound trains onto the outbound track. The station has a boxy form, with a similar shape to the original Extension stations but built in a different style.

=== Infrastructure restoration ===
Maximum speeds were restored from 45 miles per hour (72 km/h) to 55 miles per hour (89 km/h) north of Assembly station on August 24, 2025, and between North Station and Assembly station on October 18, 2026. 55 mph was the original speed of the Haymarket North Extension, but the limit was lowered over time as the infrastructure was neglected.
