= Route 15 (MBTA) =

Bus route in Boston

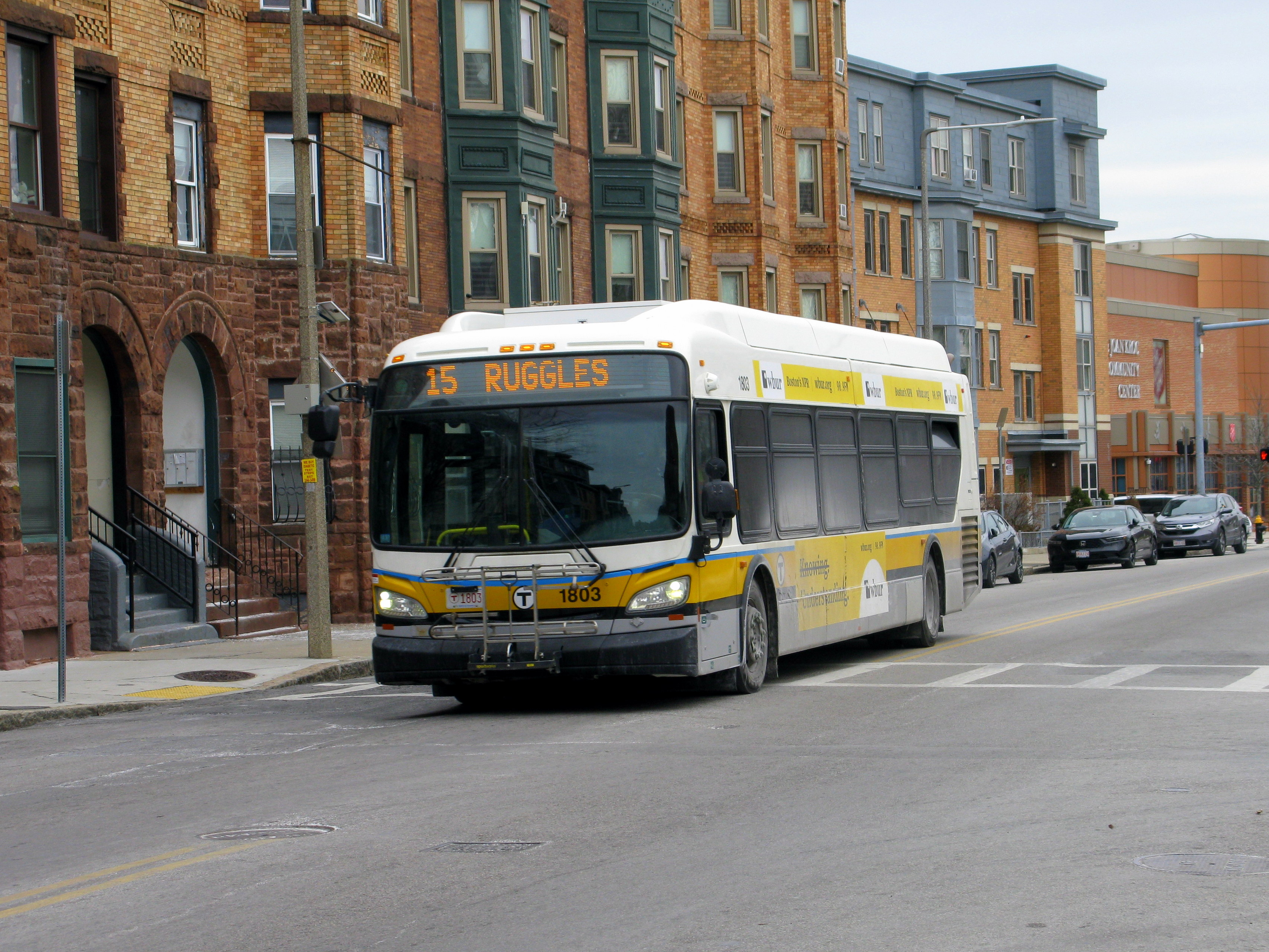
- A route 15 bus on Dudley Street in 2025

Overview
- System: MBTA bus
- Garage: Albany Garage and Cabot Garage

Route
- Locale: Boston, Massachusetts
- Start: Ruggles station
- End: Fields Corner station
- Length: 4.43 miles (7.13 km) inbound; 4.52 miles (7.27 km) outbound
- Daily ridership: 5,810 (2018)
- Timetable: Route 15

Route 15 is a local bus route in Boston, Massachusetts, United States, operated by the Massachusetts Bay Transportation Authority (MBTA) as part of MBTA bus service. It operates between Ruggles station and Fields Corner station via Nubian station and Uphams Corner. It is among the highest-ridership routes on the system, with service every 15 minutes or less during all operating hours. Route 17 is a less-frequent route that operates between Andrew station and Fields Corner station. Between Fields Corner and Uphams Corner, it follows the same routing as route 15.

Most portions of routes 15 and 17 originated as horsecar lines built or acquired by the Metropolitan Railroad between 1856 and 1873. The West End Street Railway purchased and merged all the horse railroads in the Boston area in 1887. It electrified the Dudley Street and Meeting House Hill lines in 1893–94. Its successor, the Boston Elevated Railway (BERy), opened an extension of the Meeting House Hill line to Fields Corner in 1899 and re-opened a line to Andrew Square in 1901. The Washington Street Elevated opened in 1901, with some streetcar service terminated at Dudley Street Terminal rather than running to downtown Boston.

Extensions of the Cambridge–Dorchester Line to Broadway in 1917, Andrew in 1918, and Fields Corner in 1927 resulted in further changes. By the 1940s, service on Dudley Street consisted of a Dudley–Uphams Corner streetcar line (route 15), while service on Meeting House Hill consisted of an Andrew–Fields Corner streetcar line (route 17) and a belt line bus. The Metropolitan Transit Authority (MTA) replaced the BERy in 1947. It converted route 15 to trolleybuses in 1948 and route 17 in 1949. Routes 15 and 17 were converted to bus in 1962.

The Massachusetts Bay Transportation Authority (MBTA) replaced the MTA in 1964. Route 15 was extended to Ruggles in 1987 when the Southwest Corridor replaced the elevated. Weekend service was extended to Fields Corner in 2007. A number of stops on the route were closed in 2013 to reduce travel times. A 2018–19 MBTA review of its bus system found that routes 15 and 17 suffered from poor reliability. As part of systemwide network changes, all route 15 service was extended to Fields Corner in 2025.

== Routes ==
Map of route 15 ('"`UNIQ--templatestyles-00000009-QINU`"' ) and route 17 ('"`UNIQ--templatestyles-0000000A-QINU`"' )

Route 15 runs entirely in Boston between Ruggles station in the Roxbury neighborhood and Fields Corner station in the Dorchester neighborhood. From the Fields Corner station busway, the route runs northwest on Geneva Avenue and northeast on Bowdoin Street to Kane Square, then northwest on Hancock Street to Uphams Corner. It jogs northeast on Columbia Road, then runs northwest on Dudley Street to Nubian Square, where it loops into the Nubian station bus terminal. It runs west on Malcolm X Boulevard to Roxbury Crossing station, then northeast on Tremont Street and northwest on Ruggles Street to the Ruggles station busway. Total distance is 4.43 miles (7.13 km) inbound and 4.52 miles (7.27 km) outbound.

Scheduled one-way running times on route 15 range from about 35 minutes off-peak to 40–50 minutes at peak, with shorter times during early mornings and late nights. Service operates from about 5:00 am to 1:00 am Monday through Saturdays and from about 6:00 am to 1:00 am on Sundays. Several early-morning inbound trips operate only to Nubian, where they are through-routed with route 171. One early-morning round trip runs between Mattapan and Haymarket via the route 15 routing. Scheduled headways are 15 minutes or less at all operating hours. MBTA subway connections are available to the Orange Line at Ruggles and Roxbury Crossing, the Silver Line at Nubian, and the Red Line at Fields Corner.

In 2018, route 15 averaged 5,810 boardings on weekdays, placing it among the highest-ridership routes in the MBTA bus system. Average weekend ridership was 3,700 on Saturdays and 3,070 on Sundays. All of the routing is shared with other MBTA bus routes. The Uphams Corner–Fields Corner segment is also served by route 17, plus route 19 on Geneva Avenue. The Uphams Corner–Nubian segment is also served by route 41, plus route 45 west of Blue Hill Avenue. The Nubian–Ruggles segment is also served by routes 23, 28, 44, and 45, as well as route 22 on Tremont Street and routes 14, 41, and 66 on Malcolm X Boulevard.

Route 17 follows the same alignment as route 15 from Fields Corner to Uphams Corner, then continues north on Columbia Road and Boston Street to Andrew station in South Boston. The Columbia Road segment is also used by routes 16 and 41. Total distance is about 3 miles (4.8 km) in each direction, with scheduled running times of 20–25 minutes. It runs less frequently than route 15, with headways of 20–30 minutes on weekdays, 30 minutes on Saturdays, and 60 minutes on Sundays. Service operates from about 5:00 am to 10:00 pm Monday through Saturdays and from about 9:00 am to 7:00 pm on Sundays. In 2018, route 17 averaged 3,090 passengers on weekdays, 1,440 passengers on Saturdays, and 570 passengers on Sundays.

Routes 15 and 17 run as local routes with standard local bus fare. The routes are operated with standard 40-foot (12 m) transit buses based at Albany Garage and Cabot Garage in Boston.

== History ==
=== Early history ===
Map showing the horsecar systems around Boston as of 1886

Most portions of what became routes 15 and 17 originated as horsecar lines. The Metropolitan Railroad opened a horsecar line between Dudley Square (now Nubian Square) and downtown Boston via Washington Street on September 17, 1856. A branch following Eustis Street, Davis Street (now Dearborn Street), and Dudley Street to the Roxbury/Dorchester border (Mount Pleasant) near Shirley Street opened on November 17, 1856. It was extended slightly to a carhouse at Burrell Street in 1865. Connecting track on Dudley Street between Dudley Square and Dearborn Street was opened on May 12, 1873, by the Highland Railway to reach its line on Blue Hill Avenue.

In May 1860, the Dorchester Extension Railway built the Meeting House Hill line from Andrew Square to Washington Street in Dorchester via Boston Road, Hancock Street, and Bowdoin Street. The portion south of Geneva Avenue was later abandoned. The Metropolitan acquired the Dorchester Extension in October 1863. On December 18, 1873, the Metropolitan extended its Mount Pleasant line to Uphams Corner, where it connected to the Meeting House Hill line. The former line was later abandoned north of Uphams Corner, with all service from Meeting House Hill operating via Mount Pleasant. Later in the 1870s, the company built a carhouse and stables at Mount Pleasant.

The Metropolitan opened a line east from Uphams Corner to Dorchester Avenue via Stoughton Street, Pleasant Street, and Savin Hill Avenue on November 15, 1880. The West End Street Railway purchased and merged all the horse railroads in the Boston area in 1887. By that time, three services ran to downtown Boston via Dudley Street: from Fields Corner via Dorchester Avenue every 20 minutes, from Meeting House Hill every 15 minutes, and from Uphams Corner every 6–10 minutes. After consolidation, the West End used paint color to differentiate cars on its various lines. Those on the Mount Pleasant, Meeting House Hill, and Dorchester Avenue lines were painted ultramarine blue with gold trim.

The West End began electrifying its system in 1889. Dudley Street was electrified between Dudley Square and Blue Hill Avenue on December 12, 1891, as part of a line to Grove Hall via Blue Hill Avenue. Uphams Corner service via Dudley Street was electrified on January 5, 1893; horsecar shuttle service operated between Meeting House Hill and Uphams Corner. Electric service was extended to Meeting House Hill on May 14, 1893. On July 28, 1894, the West End started a new electric streetcar line between Fields Corner and downtown Boston via Dorchester Avenue and Uphams Corner, inaugurating electric service on the 1880-built extension. The Meeting House Hill line was extended on Bowdoin Street to Washington Street by mid-1896. Service ran from the Ashmont Street Carhouse to North Union Station.

=== Streetcar changes ===
Routes using the Dudley Street and Meeting House Hill lines shown on a 1921 map

The first phase of the Tremont Street subway, a streetcar tunnel in downtown Boston, opened on September 1, 1897. Routes on Boylston Street could enter the subway through the Boylston Street portal to reach Park Street station. "Crosstown" routes from Fields Corner and Meeting House Hill, which used Massachusetts Avenue and Huntington Avenue to reach Boylston Street, were redirected into the subway at that time. On October 1, 1897, the Boston Elevated Railway (BERy) acquired the West End Street Railway. Track on Geneva Avenue between Bowdoin Street and Fields Corner opened on June 1, 1899. The Meeting House Hill crosstown service was rerouted to terminate at Fields Corner rather than Ashmont. A streetcar line on Columbia Road and Boston Street opened on June 22, 1901, using a short section of existing tracks through Uphams Corner.

The Main Line Elevated opened on June 10, 1901, with Dudley Street Terminal as the southern terminus of the Washington Street Elevated. Some streetcar routes terminated at Dudley, where passengers could transfer to the faster elevated trains, while others continued to operate into the downtown subway. By 1907, routes operated to Dudley via Uphams Corner from Park Street Carhouse (via Geneva Avenue), Adams Village (via Dorchester Avenue), and Neponset (via Dorchester Avenue). Two crosstown routes operated to Park Street station in the subway via Uphams Corner, Dudley, and Back Bay: from Park Street Carhouse via Geneva Avenue (some trips via Dorchester Avenue), and from Milton via Savin Hill.

Service on the Meeting House Hill line in 1917 included a Fields Corner–Essex Street route with off-peak frequency of every 20 minutes, a Fields Corner–Dudley route operating every 10 minutes, a Norfolk Street–Essex Street route operating every 20 minutes, and an Ashmont Carhouse–Rowes Wharf route via South Boston operating every 10 minutes. Service operating on Dudley Street included the Fields Corner–Dudley route, a Milton–Park Street crosstown route via Savin Hill operating every 10 minutes and a Neponset–Dudley route via Savin Hill operating every 5 minutes. On December 15, 1917, the Cambridge–Dorchester Line was extended south to Broadway station in South Boston. Many Dorchester streetcar routes were redirected to Broadway station. The Meeting House Hill line was served by a Fields Corner–Broadway route and a Milton–Broadway route via Washington Street. The Milton crosstown line was discontinued, leaving only the Neponset–Dudley line on most of Dudley Street.

On January 26, 1918, the BERy increased Dorchester streetcar service in response to overcrowding. This included establishment of a Meeting House Hill route from Bowdoin Street and Geneva Street to Dudley, operating every four minutes at peak and every ten minutes off-peak. The Cambridge–Dorchester Line was extended again to Andrew station on June 29, 1918; streetcar routes were cut back to Andrew station from Broadway. The Neponset line was redirected to Andrew; a new Fields Corner–Dudley route via Savin Hill began service. The Fields Corner–Dudley route was extended to Massachusetts station via Washington Street and Massachusetts Avenue on October 16, 1920.

In late 1920, the Dudley Street line was used by three services: the Massachusetts–Fields Corner route, operating every four minutes at peak and every 7–8 minutes at other times; the Dudley–Bowdoin and Geneva route, operating every 10 minutes at peak and every 20 minutes at other times; and a peak-only Dudley–Uphams Corner route operating every four minutes. The Meeting House Hill line was served by the Dudley–Bowdoin and Geneva route; the Andrew–Fields Corner route, operating every four minutes at peak (as two-car trains, with a streetcar pulling an unpowered trailer car) and every twelve minutes at other times; and the Andrew–Milton route, operating every six minutes at peak and every 12 minutes at other times.

The Andrew–Meeting House Hill–Milton route was cut back to the Ashmont Street Carhouse on February 12, 1921, with a shuttle car operating between Ashmont Street and Milton. (Note: The section south of Ashmont Street was sparsely populated, and the line had single track between Fairmount Street and Codman Street.) The shuttle service was discontinued on May 7, 1921, with service operated between Washington Street at Fairmount Street and Andrew. Frequency was increased on the Andrew–Fields Corner and Andrew–Fairmount lines on February 25, 1922. Rush-hour frequency on the two services was increased again to three-minute headways on November 19, 1923. The Massachusetts–Fields Corner route – which had been reduced to single cars – resumed operating two-car trains at that time, with additional rush hour service operated between Dudley and Fields Corner.

Further extension of the Cambridge–Dorchester Line took place in the late 1920s. Fields Corner station opened on November 5, 1927, replacing the adjacent Park Street Carhouse as a streetcar terminal. It became the southern terminal of the Fields Corner–Massachusetts station route operating via Savin Hill and Dudley Street. Several services operated on the Meeting House Hill line at that time: Washington and Fairmount–Andrew station, Bowdoin Street and Geneva Avenue–Dudley Street, and Washington and Ashmont–Dudley (rush hours only).

=== Bus conversions ===
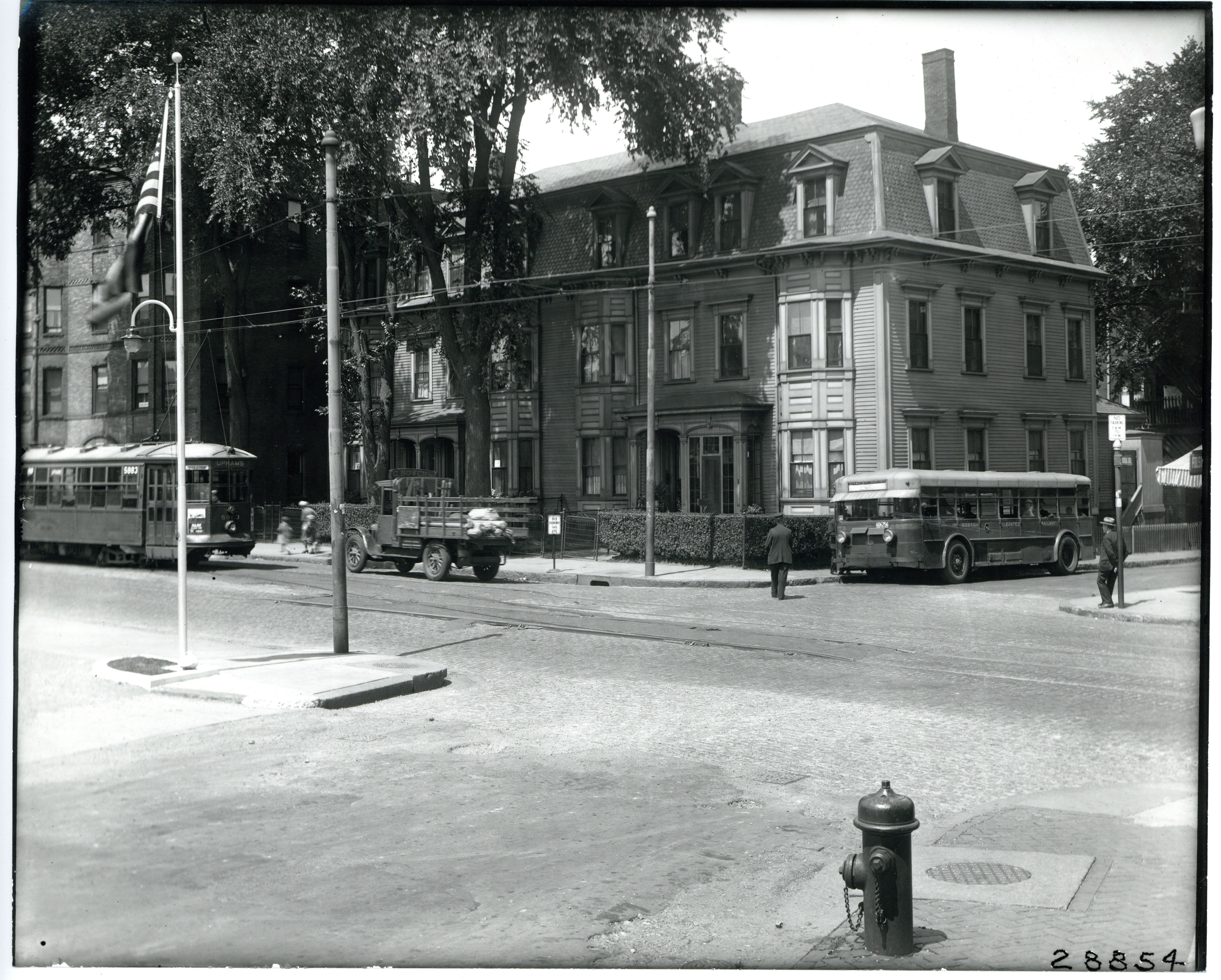
Streetcar and bus on Dudley Street in 1933

A final extension of the Cambridge–Dorchester Line to Ashmont station (Note: The station was located about 0.4 miles (0.6 km) east of the similarly named Ashmont Street Carhouse.) opened on September 1, 1928. The BERy planned to simultaneously convert several streetcar lines to buses, but that was delayed by city permitting. Streetcar service on Washington Street between Codman Square and Fairmount Street was ultimately replaced with a bus route on September 22, 1928.

In February 1929, the BERy began operating a "Fields Corner belt line" circulator bus. It operated in a counterclockwise loop via Dorchester Avenue, Savin Hill Avenue, Pleasant Street, Stoughton Street, Columbia Road, Hancock Street, Bowdoin Street, Washington Street, and Talbot Avenue – all of which were served by existing streetcar lines. The segment between Uphams Corner and Fields Corner via Savin Hill was dropped on February 22, 1930, leaving an Uphams Corner–Fields Corner route via Meeting House Hill and Ashmont station. The Fields Corner–Massachusetts route was cut back to a Fields Corner–Dudley route on June 27, 1931. The Dudley–Massachusetts segment continued to operate as a separate route.

Streetcar service on Dorchester Avenue ended on July 5, 1932, due to repaving. The Dudley–Fields Corner route was replaced by an Uphams Corner–Savin Hill–Fields Corner bus route; streetcar service continued between Dudley and Uphams Corner. Overnight "Owl" streetcar service was rerouted via Meeting House Hill; the new bus route also operated overnight. The BERy planned in late 1932 to resume streetcar service between Uphams Corner and Savin Hill, but residents preferred the bus service.

On February 18, 1933, the Fields Corner belt line was restored to its previous routing. Two days later, Meeting House Hill overnight service began operating only to Andrew; the Uphams Corner–Fields Corner overnight bus was extended to a Dudley–Milton route. On July 29, 1933, the BERy began operating a Dudley–Savin Hill station bus route via Dudley Street. One track on the portion of Bowdoin Street south of Geneva Avenue, no longer used for revenue service, was abandoned in 1935. The other track was retained as a service track until 1940.

By November 1937, service on Dudley Street consisted of the Dudley–Uphams Corner streetcar line and Dudley–Savin Hill station bus route. Service on Hancock and Bowdoin streets over Meeting House Hill consisted of the Andrew–Fields Corner streetcar line plus the Fields Corner belt line bus. The Dudley–Savin Hill station bus route was discontinued on February 14, 1940. Owl service in 1940 included the Dudley–Milton bus line via Dorchester Avenue and a Scollay Square–Neponset streetcar line via Andrew and Meeting House Hill. In 1940–41, the BERy reassigned the public route numbers used for its services; those numbers have remained relatively consistent since. The Dudley–Uphams Corner route was numbered 15; the Andrew–Fields Corner route was numbered 17, and the belt line bus was numbered 18.

=== Trolleybus conversions ===
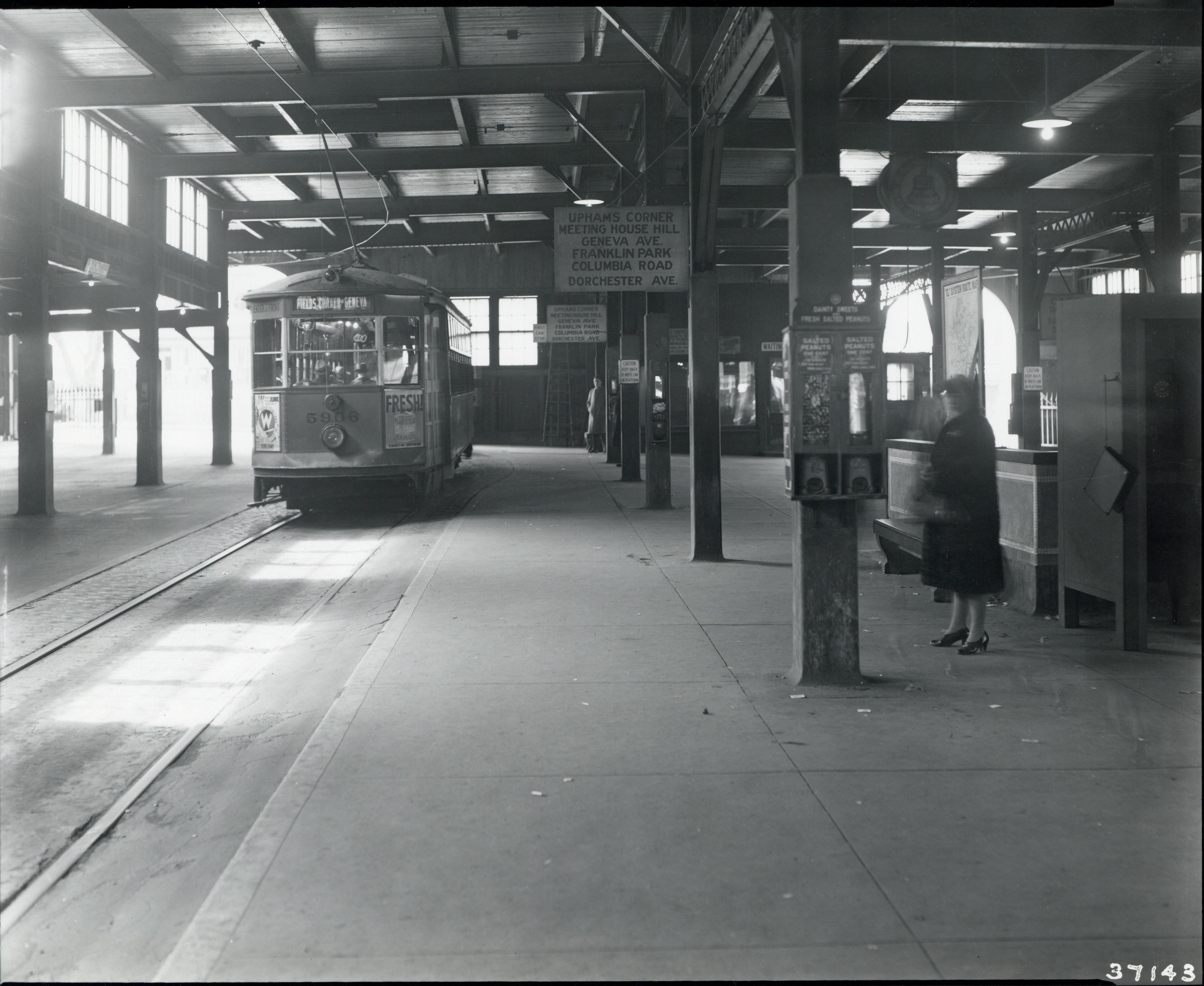
A route 17 streetcar at Andrew in the 1940s

In the 1940s, route 15 and 17 used Type Five streetcars based out of Park Street Carhouse in Fields Corner. The eastern terminus of route 15 was at a pair of crossovers in the median of Columbia Road just south of Hancock Street, about two blocks south of the Uphams Corner intersection. Streetcars ran northeast on Columbia Road then northwest on Dudley Street to Dudley Street Terminal, where they used the eastern elevated loop track. Round-trip running time was scheduled for 19 minutes. In April 1945, the line ran every three minutes during the morning and afternoon peaks, every nine minutes during midday, and every eight minutes during the evening, for a total of 218 daily round trips. Rush hour service required 10 streetcars in the morning and 11 in the afternoon.

The southern terminus of route 17 was at Fields Corner station, where streetcars looped around the station, with cross-platform transfers in both directions with rapid transit trains. Streetcars ran northwest on Geneva Avenue and northeast on Bowdoin Street to Kane Square, then northwest on Hancock Street to Uphams Corner. They continued north on Columbia Road, sharing a median reservation with route 16, then re-entered mixed traffic at Edward Everett Square and continued north on Boston Street. At Andrew Square, cars looped counterclockwise around the 1940-installed traffic circle, onto Dorchester Avenue, and into Andrew station. Leaving the station, they turned onto Ellery Street, Southampton Street, then onto Boston Street at the traffic circle. Round-trip running time was scheduled for 36 minutes. In April 1945, the line ran every four minutes during the morning and afternoon peaks, every ten minutes during midday, and every fifteen minutes during the evening, for a total of 155 daily round trips. Rush hour service required eleven streetcars.

The Metropolitan Transit Authority (MTA) replaced the BERy in 1947. The next year, the MTA began work to convert the remaining streetcar lines in Roxbury and Dorchester to trolleybuses – an expansion of the area's trolleybus network. Construction of double overhead lines began in early 1948. Various facilities were modified for use by trolleybuses, including Park Street Carhouse, Fields Corner station, and Andrew station. The most significant changes took place at Dudley Street Terminal, where the east loop was completely rebuilt. Beginning on July 16, 1948, streetcar routes including route 15 were temporarily diverted to the west loop to allow construction to take place.

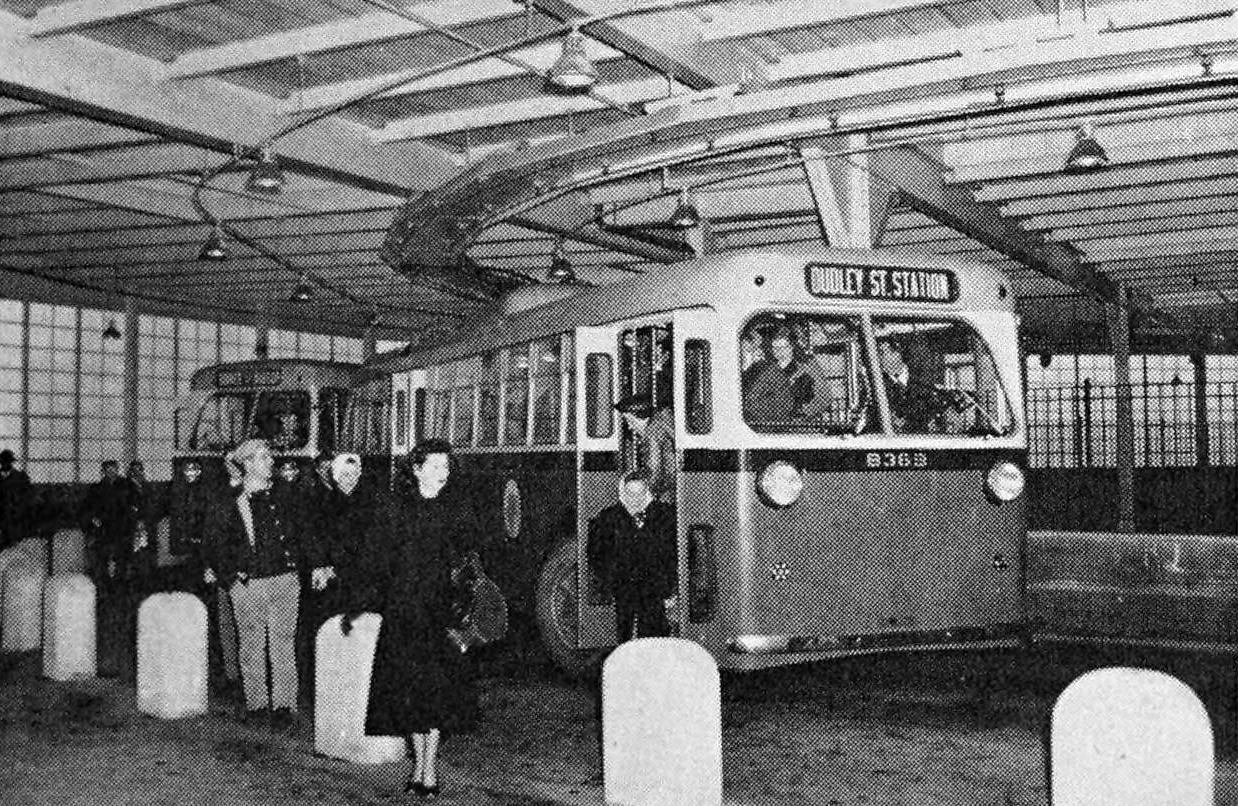
Trolleybuses at Dudley station in 1949

The first test of a trolleybus on the Roxbury/Dorchester network was over route 17 in June 1948. It was originally planned to be the first route to be converted for regular operation; instead, it was used to train operators. The first conversions were routes 15 and 45 on December 25, 1948. Route 15 was extended along the route 17 alignment to Kane Square (the intersection of Hancock Street and Bowdoin Street). Owl service on route 17 was also converted to bus at that time. (Note: The Fields Corner–Neponset section of the Scollay Square–Neponset Owl route had been converted to bus on June 19, 1948, along with daytime service on that corridor (route 20), leaving a Fields Corner–Scollay Square streetcar Owl route. After the December 25 change, overnight bus service operated between Andrew and Neponset, with streetcar service continuing north of Andrew.) Daytime service on route 17 was converted to trolleybus on February 12, 1949. The Andrew–Uphams Corner portion was still served by streetcars on route 16 until it was converted to trolleybus on December 10, 1949.

=== Into the MBTA era ===
The western portion of the route 18 belt line, between Fields Corner and Uphams Corner via Meeting House Hill, was discontinued in June 1954. (Note: A Codman Square–Kane Square route, soon extended to Uphams Corner, was trialed at that time. It operated until December 1960.) On December 29, 1962, bus routes serving Savin Hill station were modified. Route 18 and route 12 (Andrew–Savin Hill) were combined into Andrew–Ashmont route 18; the former segment between Dorchester Avenue and Uphams Corner was left unserved. On June 22, 1963, the MTA resumed operation of Northampton–Savin Hill route 13, with every alternate trip routed via Uphams Corner to serve the discontinued segment. The routing via Dorchester Avenue was discontinued in October 1979, with all service operating via Uphams Corner. Route 13 was discontinued on April 4, 1981, ending transit service on Stoughton Street, Pleasant Street, and Savin Hill Avenue.

Beginning on November 11, 1957, the Roxbury/Dorchester trolleybus system was operated with buses on Sundays; some routes also used buses on Saturdays. Owl service ended systemwide on June 25, 1960, as a cost-cutting measure. Most of the remaining trackless trolley routes were converted to buses between 1961 and 1963. (Note: Longtime general manager Edward Dana, who retired in 1959, had been a proponent of trackless trolleys. His successor, Thomas McLernon, saw them as antiquated and moved to replace them with buses.) The MTA planned to convert the Roxbury/Dorchester trolleybus system to buses on March 31, 1962. The planned conversion was one of several labor issues that led to a two-day strike by the Boston Carmen's Union on March 31 and April 1. A compromise agreement delayed the start of the Spring schedule, including the bus conversion, to April 6.

The Massachusetts Bay Transportation Authority (MBTA) replaced the MTA in 1964, with routes 15 and 17 becoming part of the MBTA bus network. Route 15 was extended to Fields Corner on Sundays and evenings – with route 17 not operated at those times – from September 1962 to June 1970 and from April 1981 to June 1998. On May 2, 1987, a number of MBTA bus routes were modified as the Orange Line was relocated from the Washington Street Elevated to the Southwest Corridor. Route 15 was among the routes extended from Dudley to Ruggles station, which replaced Dudley as the main bus terminal for the Roxbury/Dorchester area. Westbound buses used New Dudley Street (Malcolm X Boulevard) and Tremont Street; eastbound buses used Tremont Street, New Dudley Street, Roxbury Street, and Dudley Street. Eastbound buses switched to a more direct route bypassing Roxbury Street in September 1994. Midday service on route 15 was extended slightly south from Kane Square to St. Peters Square (Coppen Square) in May 1987, cut back to Kane Square in June 1997, and re-extended to St. Peters Square in January 2001. In September 1990, the Andrew station busway was closed for reconstruction. Route 17 was rerouted to JFK/UMass station until September 1993, then again from October 1993 to January 1994.

=== 21st century ===
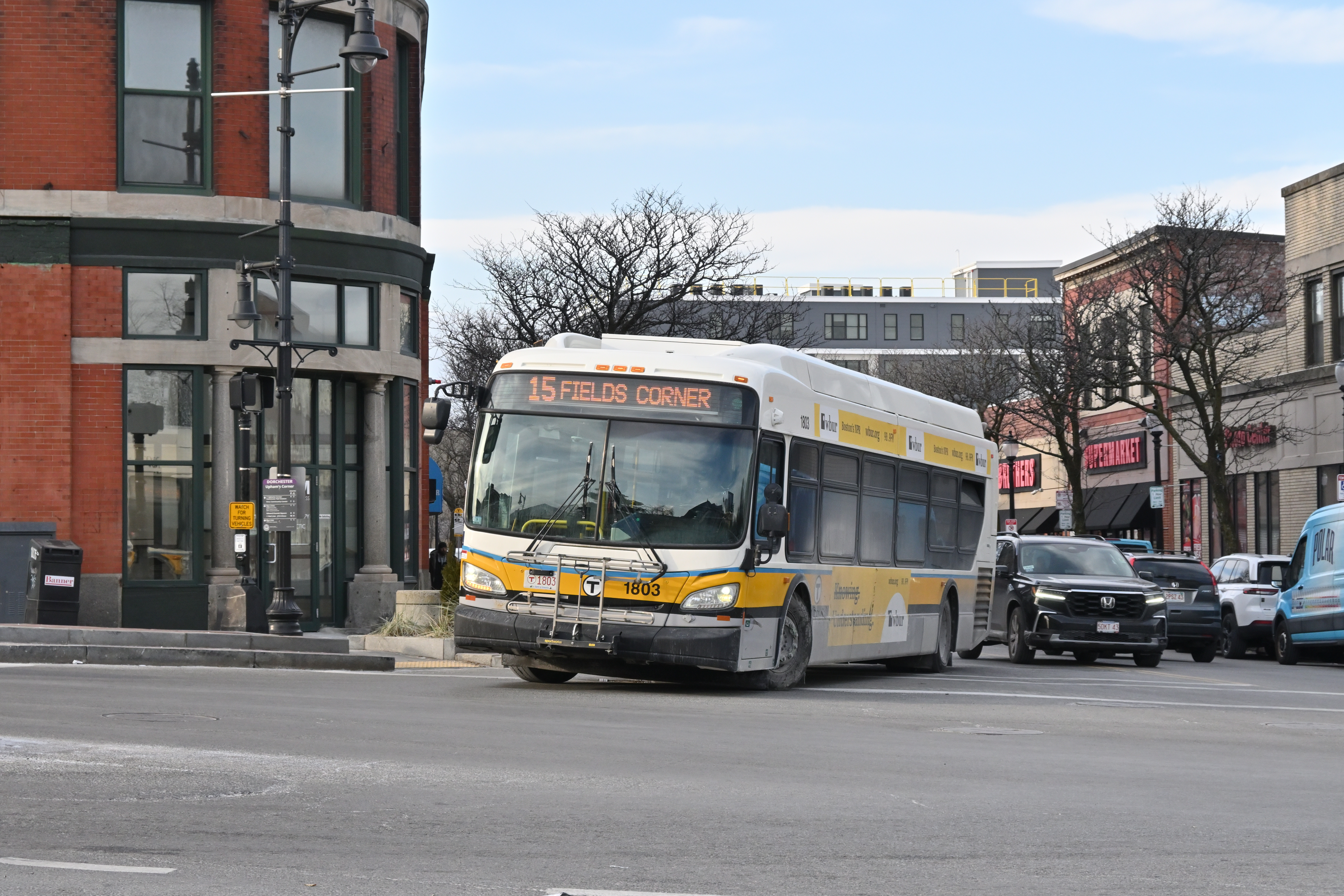
Route 15 bus at Uphams Corner in 2025

At the turn of the century, route 15 was the 12th-busiest MBTA bus route with 6,779 weekday riders. Route 17 was 31st with 3,641 weekday riders. In 2004–2005, the MBTA designated a set of 15 high-ridership routes, including route 15, as "key bus routes" to be prioritized for service improvements. The first round of adjustments, made in 2006–07, included additional frequency on route 15. Beginning December 29, 2007, evening and weekend service on route 15 was extended to Fields Corner station to supplement route 17. A second round of changes to the key routes were funded by the American Recovery and Reinvestment Act of 2009. Preliminary recommendations for route 15 released in 2012 included wider stop spacing, lengthening of stops to allow buses to pull fully to the curb, and additional amenities at stops. The 36 existing stops (17 eastbound / 19 westbound) were to be reduced to 24 (12 each direction). Construction of the changes took place in 2013.

Beginning March 28, 2014, the MBTA added late-night service on Friday and Saturday nights. This consisted of service until 2:30 am on the subway system and the key bus routes. The late-night service was eliminated on five routes, including route 15, in June 2015; it lasted until March 2016 on the other routes. In September 2014, half of Saturday afternoon service on route 15 was cut back to Kane Square, allowing higher frequency west of Kane Square.

A 2018–19 MBTA review of its bus system found that route 15 had issues with service quality. Overall reliability was 73% on weekdays, largely caused by running times being longer than scheduled; the schedule was adjusted as a result. Route 17 had similar issues, with weekday reliability of 61%; its schedule was also adjusted. No other near-term changes were proposed. On September 1, 2019, all Saturday afternoon service resumed operating to Fields Corner. Most MBTA bus routes, including routes 15 and 17, were placed on a Saturday schedule effective March 17, 2020, due to the COVID-19 pandemic. Regular service levels on a number of routes, including route 15, resumed on June 21, 2020. Route 17 returned to regular service levels effective August 30, 2020.

In May 2022, the MBTA released a draft plan for a systemwide network redesign. The draft called for route 15 to be extended west to Oak Square via Brookline Village (taking over route 65) and south to Fields Corner at all times, forming an Oak Square–Fields Corner route. It would operate every 15 minutes or less at all service hours. Route 17 would be discontinued, as its full route would be served by high-frequency service on routes 15 and 16. A revised proposal in November 2022 called for route 15 to operate between Ruggles and Fields Corner at all times with improved frequency; route 17 would continue to operate. On August 25, 2024, all Kane Square service on route 15 was extended to St. Peters Square. Service changes effective August 24, 2025, implemented the increased frequency on route 15. All service was extended to Fields Corner.

A 2024 report by advocacy group TransitMatters rated route 15 the second-slowest MBTA bus route in 2023, with an average speed of 6.65 miles per hour (10.70 km/h). Average speed for the route improved in 2024. As of 2025, center-running bus lanes on Tremont Street for route 15 and other routes are planned to be constructed in 2026. Plans for bus lanes on Malcolm X Boulevard were announced in 2020. A 2022 federal grant which was to be used for bus lanes and other improvements on corridors including Malcolm X Boulevard was rescinded in 2025.
