= Shawmut station =

Subway station in Boston, Massachusetts, US

Shawmut
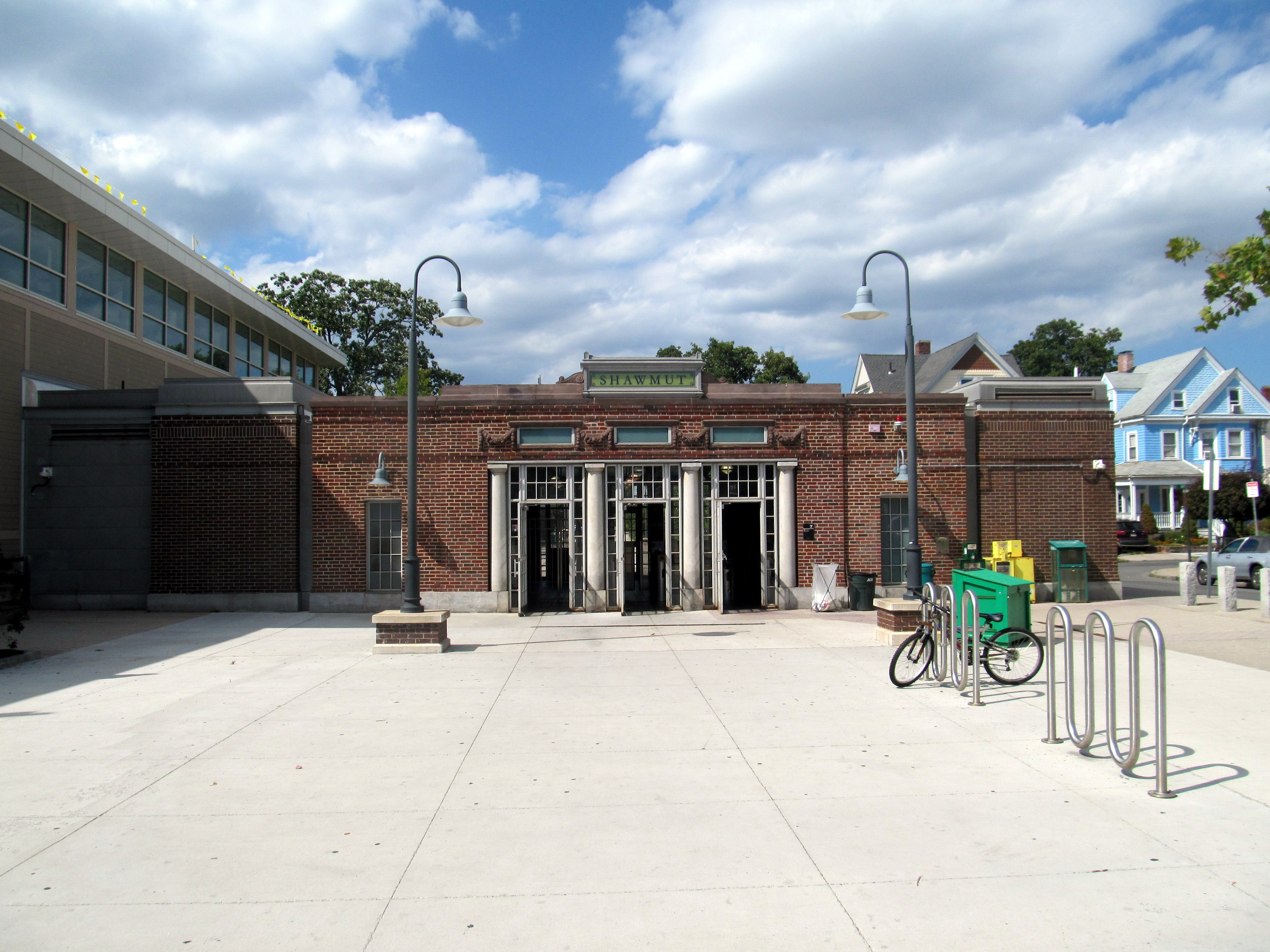
- Shawmut station headhouse in August 2016

General information
- Location: Dayton Street at Clementine Park; Dorchester, Boston, Massachusetts
- Coordinates: 42.29314°N 71.06581°W
- Line: Ashmont Branch (Shawmut Branch)
- Platforms: 2 side platforms
- Tracks: 2

Construction
- Structure type: Underground
- Accessible: Yes

History
- Opened: 1872 (original station); September 1, 1928 (rapid transit)
- Closed: 1926 (original station)
- Rebuilt: 1981, 2004–2009
- Former names: Melville Avenue; Centre Street

Passengers
- FY2019: 2,286 daily boardings

Services
Preceding station	MBTA	Following station
Ashmont Terminus	Red Line	Fields Corner toward Alewife
Former services
Preceding station	New York, New Haven and Hartford Railroad	Following station
Ashmont toward Mattapan	Boston–Mattapan	Fields Corner toward Boston
Location

Shawmut station is a subway station in Boston, Massachusetts. It serves the Ashmont branch of the MBTA's Red Line. It is located on Dayton Street in the Dorchester neighborhood. The station, the only underground station on the Red Line south of Andrew station, sits in a shallow cut-and-cover subway tunnel that runs from Park Street south to Peabody Square where it surfaces at Ashmont station. Shawmut opened along with Ashmont on September 1, 1928, as part of a southward extension of the Cambridge–Dorchester line.

Shawmut station has two side platforms serving the line's two tracks. The headhouse connects the two platforms and serves as a free crossover between them, with two elevators from the paid lobby to each platform. Emergency exits near the south end of the platforms lead to small brick buildings on the entrance plaza. Shawmut does not have any MBTA bus connections because the station is located in a residential neighborhood away from major streets.

== History ==
=== Shawmut Branch Railroad ===
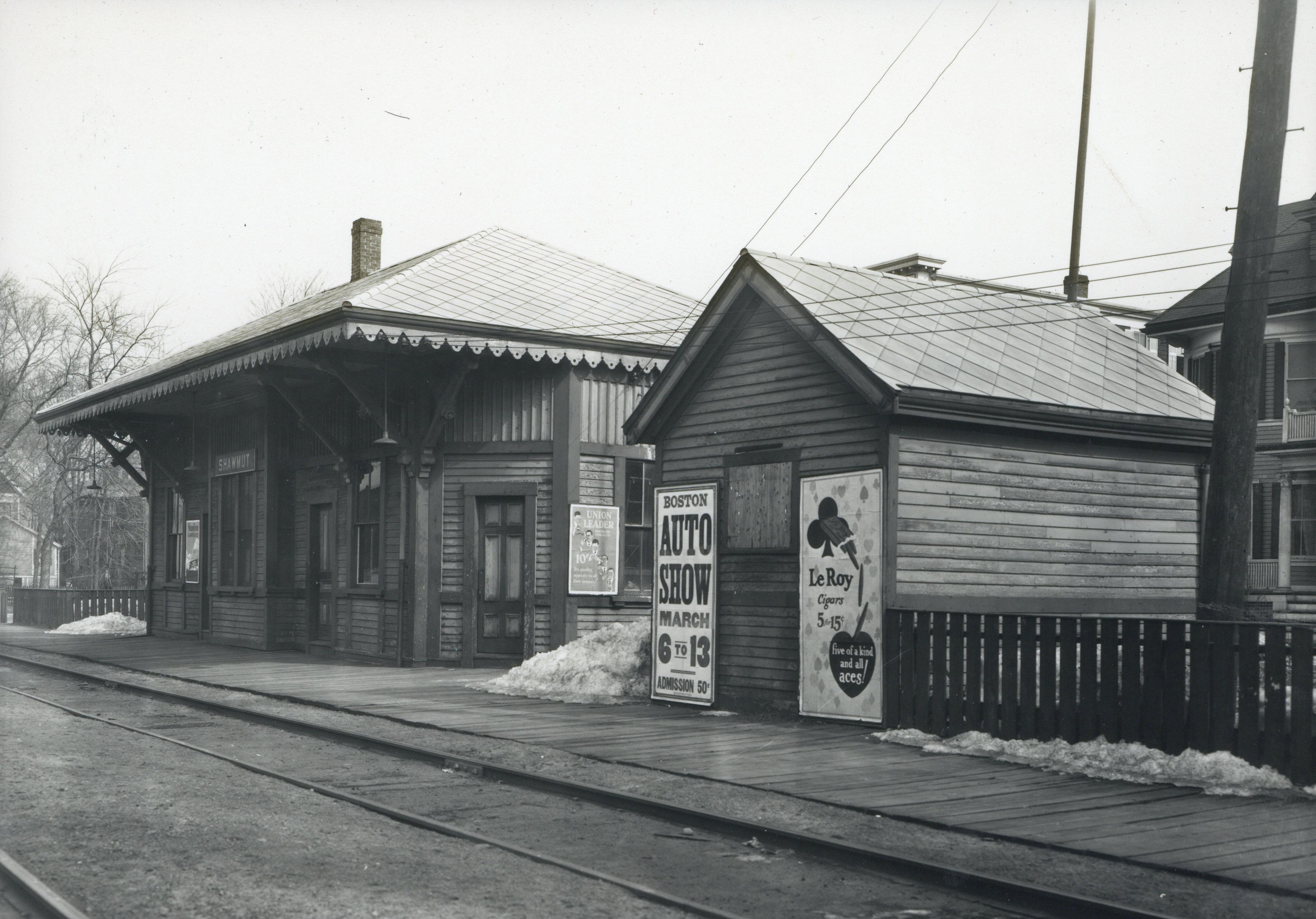
Shawmut station in 1926 shortly before it was closed to make way for the subway extension

In 1872, the Old Colony Railroad took over the Shawmut Branch Railroad, which branched off the main line at Harrison Square and ran through Dorchester to Milton. The branch line originally included stations at Melville Avenue and Centre Street, just one-quarter mile apart, which were consolidated into Shawmut station on October 11, 1884. Shawmut station was located between Mather and Centre streets on the east side of the tracks.

The New York, New Haven and Hartford Railroad acquired the Old Colony and took over operations in 1893. In 1924, the Boston Elevated Railway bought the Shawmut Branch Railroad and part of the Milton Branch in preparation for extending the Cambridge–Dorchester line, although New Haven trains ran on the line until 1926.

=== Rapid transit ===
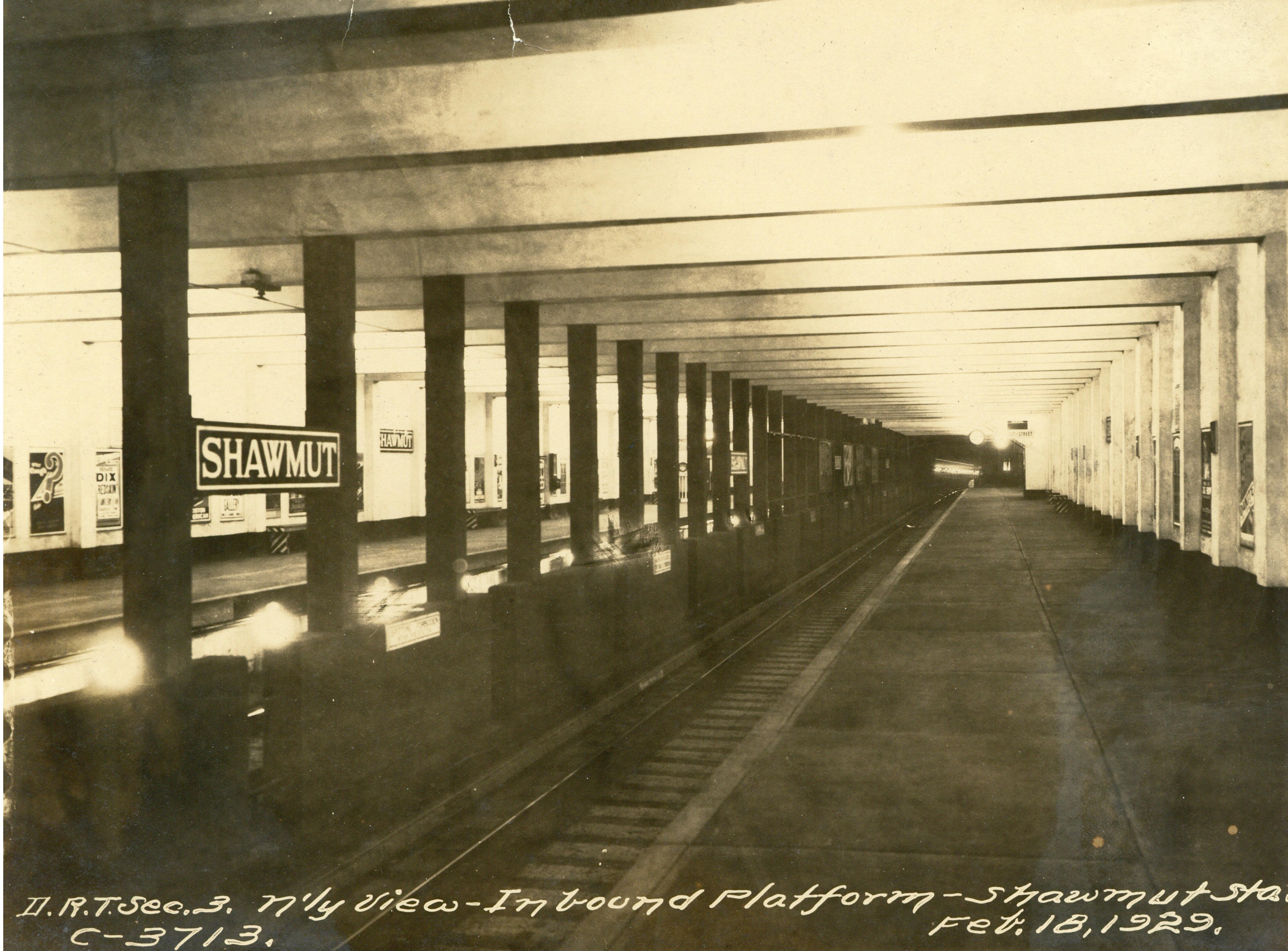
Shawmut station in 1929, shortly after opening

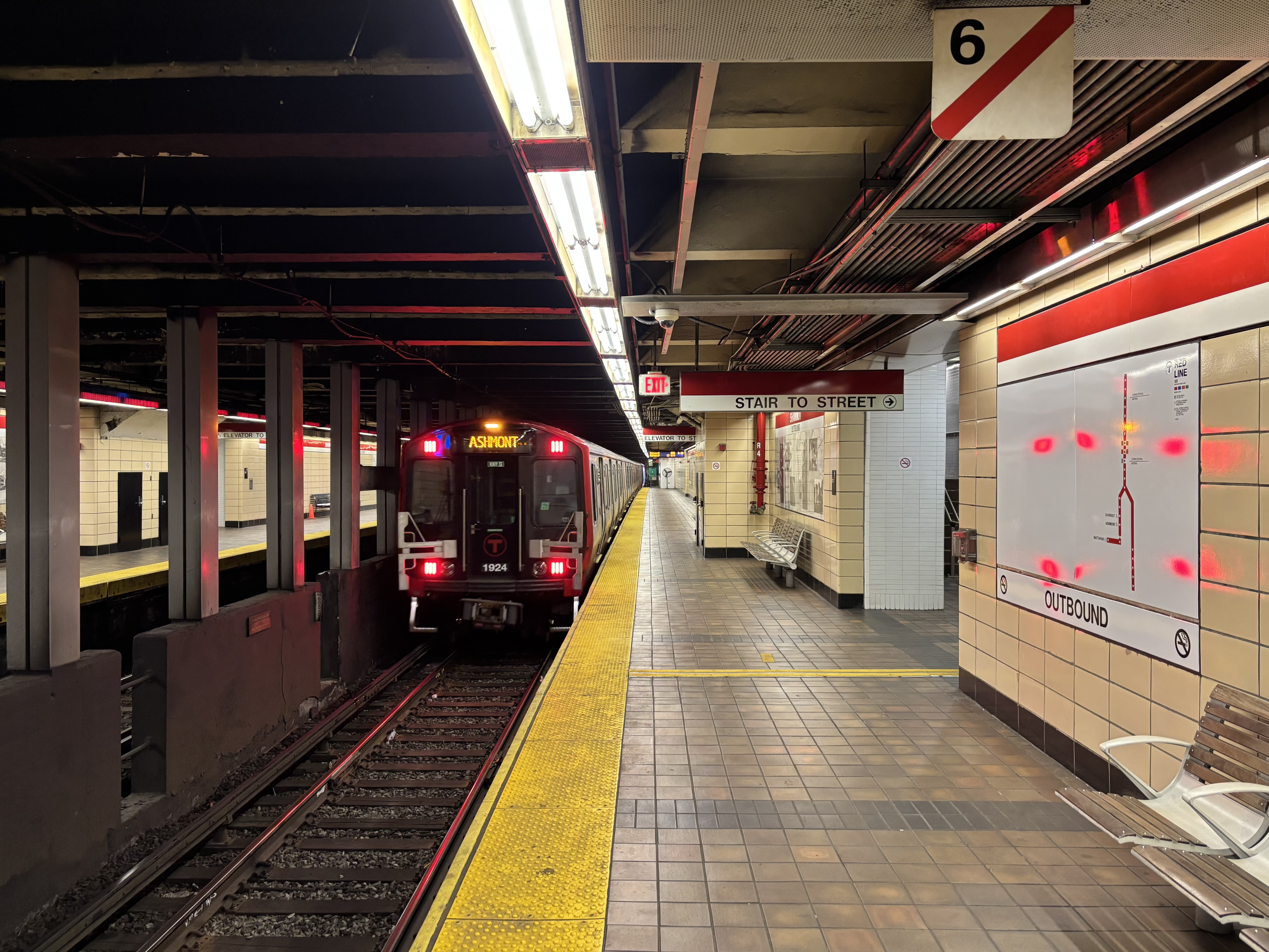
A southbound train departing Shawmut station in June 2025

The Shawmut Branch reopened as a rapid transit extension in two sections: to Fields Corner (with intermediate stops along the Old Colony mainline at Columbia and Savin Hill) in November 1927, then further to Ashmont with an intermediate stop at Shawmut on September 1, 1928.

On January 13, 1961, the MTA began operating "modified express service" on the line during the morning rush hour, following the introduction of similar service on the Forest Hills–Everett line the month before. Every other train bypassed Shawmut and three other stations. This was discontinued in September 1961 to reduce wait times at the skipped stations, most of which were outdoors. The Cambridge–Dorchester line became the Red Line in August 1965.

The station was retrofitted in 1981 to accommodate six-car trains, which started service in 1988. The station was originally built with 420-foot platforms, making it the only pre-WWII station on the line designed for six-car trains.

The MBTA issued a $4.3 million design contract for renovations of Ashmont, Shawmut, and Fields Corner stations on May 3, 2001. Shawmut and Fields Corner reached 100% design by January 10, 2003; Ashmont was delayed due to design changes. The MBTA broke ground for the Red Line Rehabilitation Project – a $67 million reconstruction of Shawmut, Fields Corner, and Savin Hill stations – in October 2003. Construction began in March 2004.

Unlike the other two stations, which were completely rebuilt, Shawmut received more modest changes. Extensions in the original style were built on both sides of the headhouse to accommodate redundant elevators for accessibility, required by the Americans with Disabilities Act of 1990. The historic headhouse and platforms were also restored, and new landscaping built around the station for walkability and noise control. Original plans to include public art as part of the Arts on the Line program were removed in budget cuts; only historical interpretive panels were installed. The modernization was completed in 2009.

Buses replaced service on the Ashmont Branch from October 14–29, 2023, to allow for track work.
