= JFK/UMass station =

Transit station in Boston, Massachusetts, US

JFK/UMass
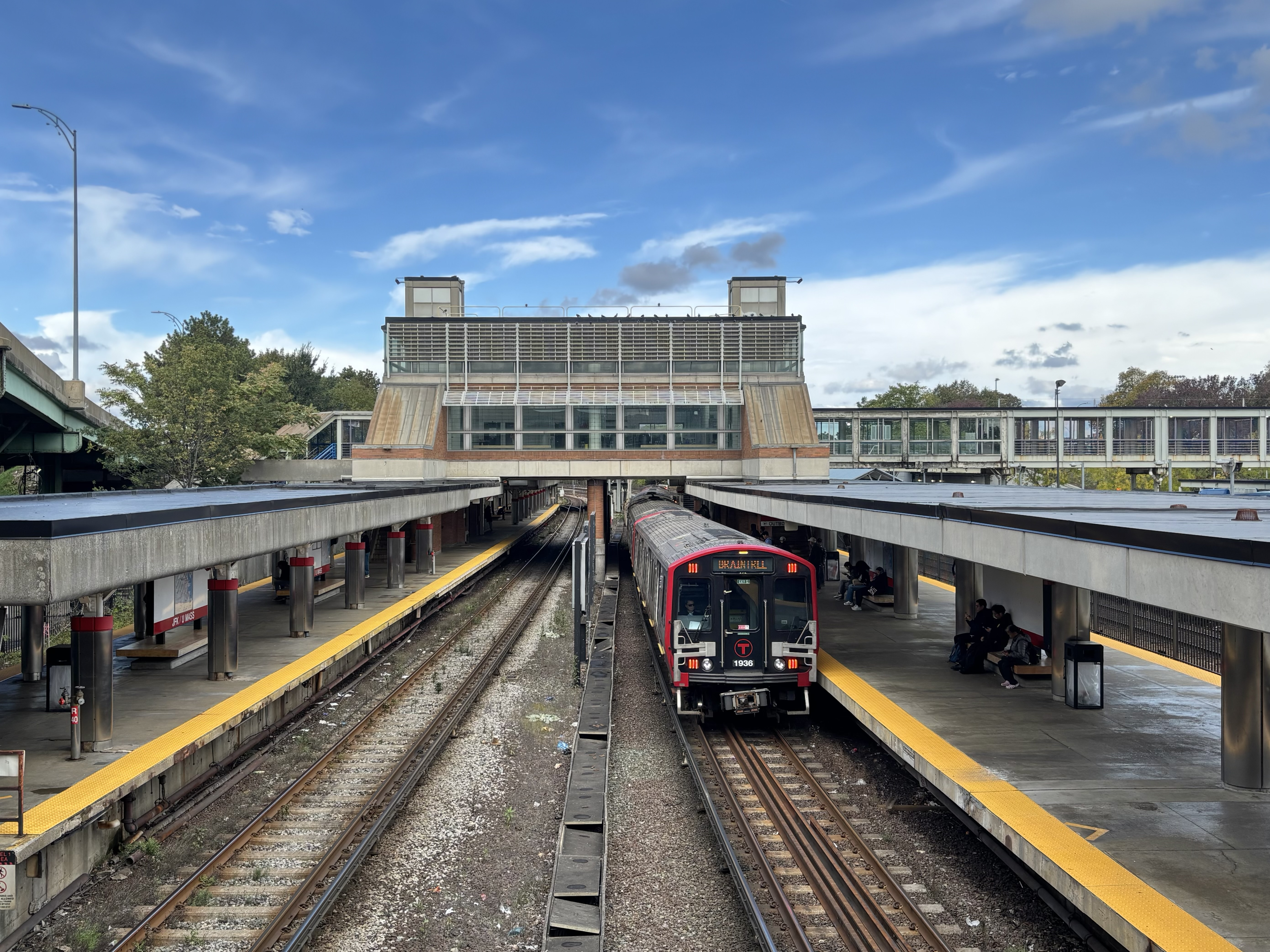
- A Braintree-bound Red Line train at the station in 2025

General information
- Location: 599 Old Colony Avenue; Boston, Massachusetts
- Coordinates: 42.32058°N 71.05239°W
- Lines: Middleborough Main Line; Ashmont Branch; Braintree Branch
- Platforms: 1 side platform (Commuter Rail); 2 island platforms (Red Line)
- Tracks: 1 (Commuter Rail); 4 (Red Line)
- Connections: MBTA bus: 8, 16, 41; UMass Boston shuttle

Construction
- Cycle facilities: Racks available
- Accessible: Yes

Other information
- Fare zone: 1A (Commuter Rail)

History
- Opened: 1840s; November 5, 1927
- Rebuilt: June 1987–December 14, 1988
- Former names: Columbia (1927–1982)

Passengers
- 2024: 1,095 daily boardings (Commuter Rail)
- FY2019: 8,012 daily boardings (Red Line)

Services
Preceding station	MBTA	Following station
Andrew toward Alewife	Red Line	Savin Hill toward Ashmont
Andrew toward Alewife	Red Line	North Quincy toward Braintree
South Station Terminus	Fall River/New Bedford Line	Quincy Center toward Fall River or New Bedford
South Station Terminus	Greenbush Line	Quincy Center toward Greenbush
South Station Terminus	Kingston Line	Quincy Center toward Kingston
Former services (Crescent Avenue station)
Preceding station	New York, New Haven and Hartford Railroad	Following station
South Boston Closed ca. 1917 toward Boston	Boston–Mattapan	Savin Hill toward Mattapan
South Boston Closed ca. 1917 toward Boston	Boston–Braintree	Savin Hill toward Braintree
Track layout
Location

JFK/UMass station is a Massachusetts Bay Transportation Authority (MBTA) intermodal transfer station, located adjacent to the Columbia Point area of Dorchester, Boston, Massachusetts. It is served by the rapid transit Red Line; the Fall River/New Bedford Line, Greenbush Line, and Kingston Line of the MBTA Commuter Rail system, and three MBTA bus routes. The station is named for the John F. Kennedy Presidential Library and Museum and the University of Massachusetts Boston, both located nearby on Columbia Point.

JFK/UMass station has four tracks and two island platforms for the Ashmont and Braintree branches of the Red Line, with one track and one side platform for the Commuter Rail. A waiting room and fare lobby over the Red Line platforms is connected to Columbia Road, Sydney Street, and the busway on the east side of the station by footbridge. The station is fully accessible. North of the station, the complex Columbia Junction connects the two Red Line branches with the downtown tunnel and Cabot Yard lead tracks.

The Old Colony Railroad first opened through the area in 1845, with Crescent Avenue serving as a flag stop by 1848. A station building opened in 1868 and was rebuilt in 1883. The Boston Elevated Railway began construction of Columbia station on the Dorchester Extension of the Cambridge–Dorchester Tunnel in 1925. Crescent Avenue station closed in July 1927; Columbia station opened on November 5, with an additional footbridge added in 1929.

Columbia station was modernized in 1970, though without a platform for South Shore (Braintree Branch) service, which started in 1971. UMass Boston moved to Columbia Point in 1974, while the Kennedy Library opened in 1979; the station was renamed JFK/UMass in 1982. A 1987–88 renovation added a platform for the Braintree Branch. Commuter Rail service on the former Old Colony, last operated in 1959, resumed in 1997. However, the platform at JFK/UMass did not open until 2001.

== Station layout ==
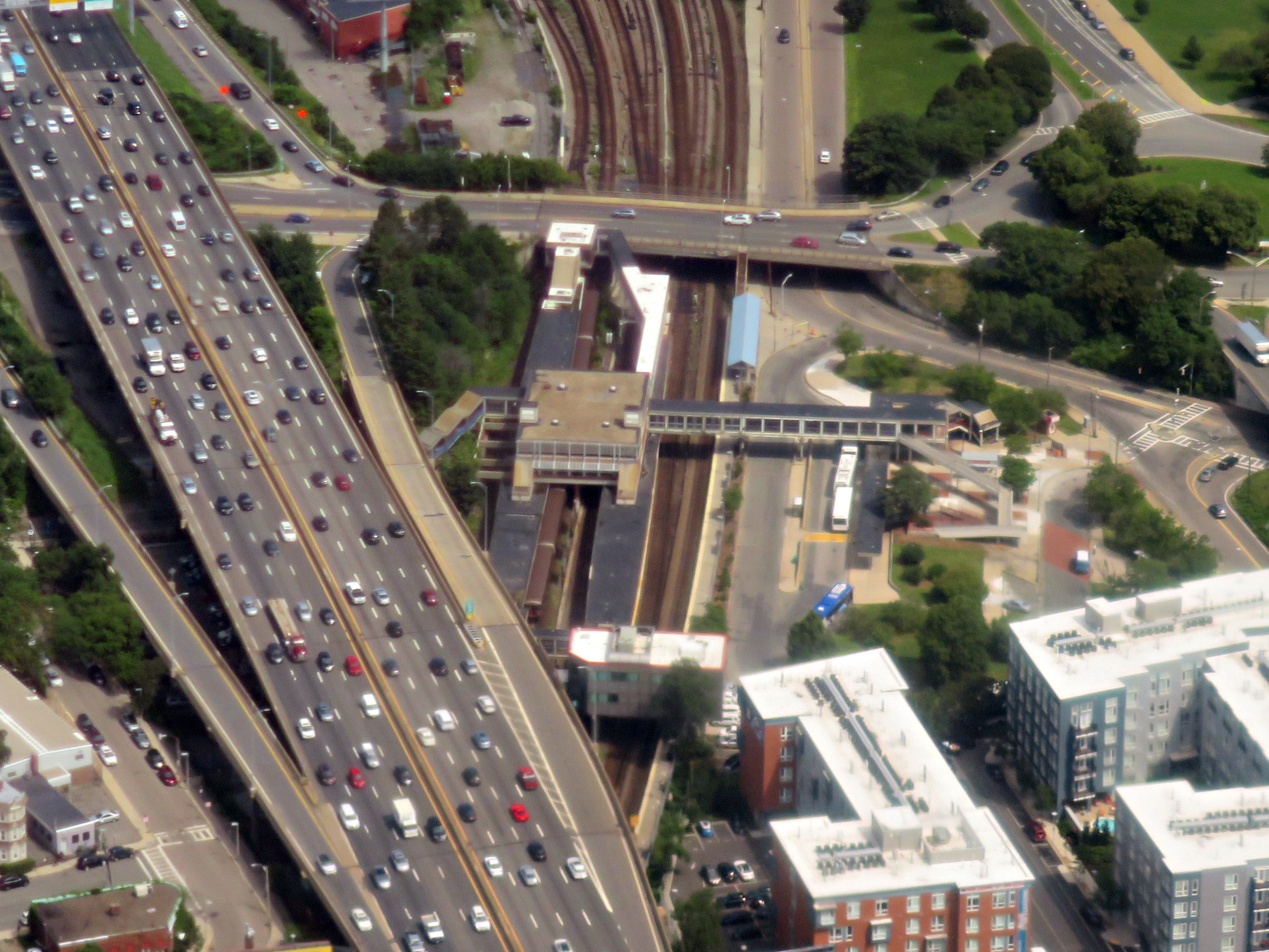
Aerial view of the station, facing north

JFK/UMass station is located south of Columbia Road near Kosciuszko Circle, with the Interstate 93 viaduct to the south and west and Morrissey Boulevard to the east. The Red Line has four tracks and two island platforms at the station; the west platform is served by the Ashmont Branch, and the east platform by the Braintree Branch. (This unusual configuration is the result of the decision to not originally have the Braintree Branch stop at the station.) East of the Red Line is a single track used by the three commuter rail lines, with an 800-foot (240 m)-long high-level side platform on its east side. A two-lane busway, drop-off lane, and plaza are located east of the tracks.

A waiting room and fare lobby is located over the middle of the Red Line platforms, with elevators and stairs to both platforms. Footbridges connect the lobby to the Columbia Road bridge to the north, Sydney Street to the west, and the east plaza via a ramp structure. Exit-only stairs also lead from the north ends of the Red Line platforms to Columbia Road, and from the south ends to Sydney Street at Crescent Avenue. Because northbound Red Line trains arrive on two different platforms, an automatic illuminated sign in the lobby indicates which platform the next northbound train will arrive at.

North of the station is a complex Red Line interlocking called Columbia Junction. The two track line from downtown Boston exits the tunnel under Dorchester Avenue about 0.4 miles (0.6 km) north of JFK/UMass station and splits into the four tracks with a flying junction. The junction also connects two yard leads from Cabot Yard, the main Red Line maintenance facility, which is located on the surface near Broadway. South of the station, the Braintree Branch tracks cross over the commuter rail tracks via a lengthy flyover. The flyover is dedicated to Milton DeVaughn, an MBTA track worker, who died in December 1993 when he fell under the wheels of an MBTA work train.

=== Bus connections ===
Columbia was not built as a transfer station; streetcar—and later, bus—routes mostly served Andrew and Fields Corner. Bus service to the station began in 1954 when the Columbia Point Development was constructed, and increased in 1974 when the UMass campus opened. The 1988 renovations added a dedicated two-lane busway on the east side of the station. The station is served by MBTA bus routes 8, 16, and 41. During service disruptions – both planned track work and unplanned incidents – JFK/UMass is often used as the terminus of busing on either Red Line branch. A privately operated shuttle bus also connects the station with the UMass campus and the John F. Kennedy Library.

== History ==
=== Old Colony Railroad ===
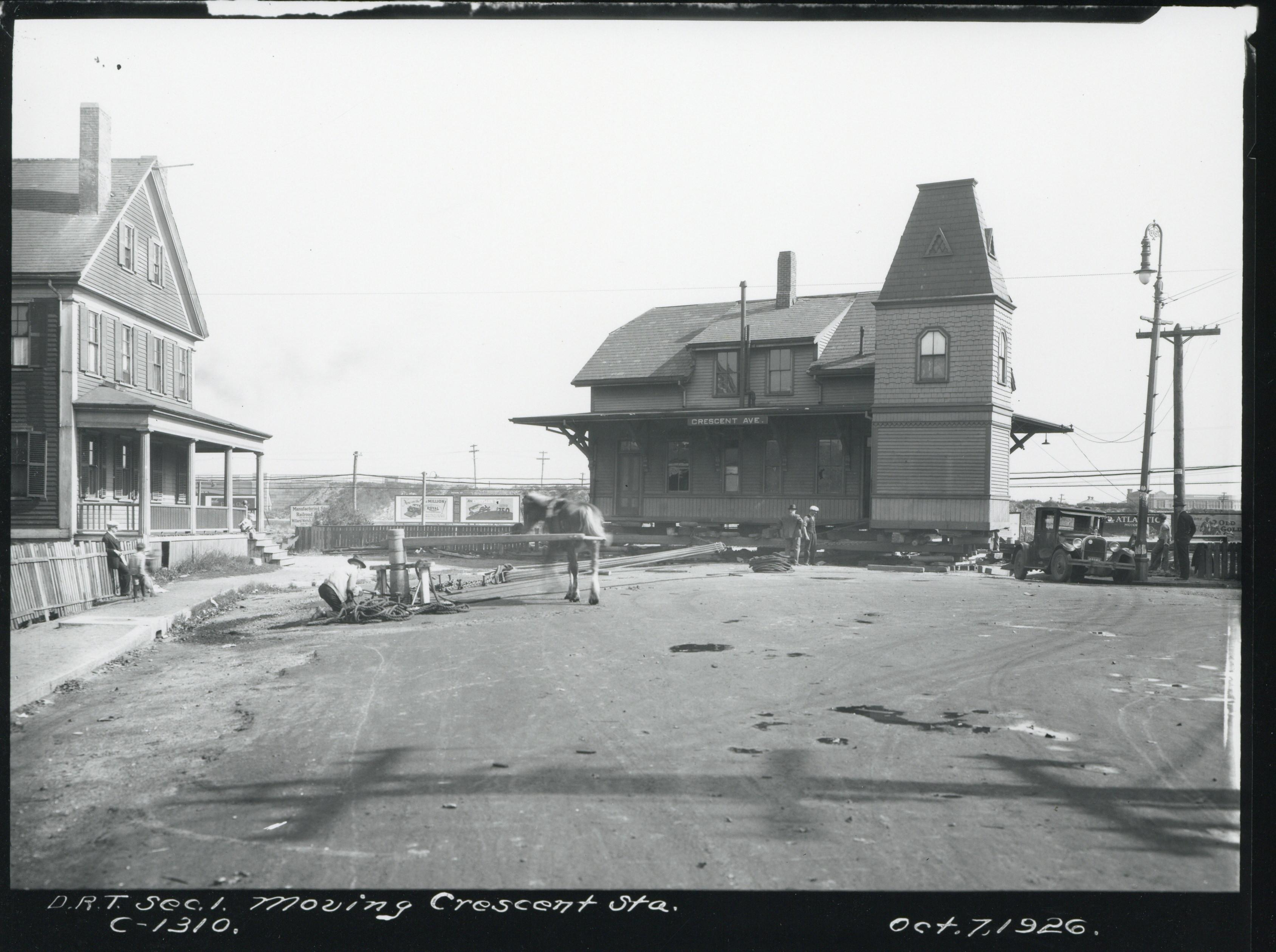
Crescent Avenue station building

In 1845, the Old Colony Railroad opened between Boston and Plymouth, Massachusetts. Crescent Avenue was a flag stop for South Braintree and Dorchester and Milton Branch trains by 1848. A station building was opened at Crescent Avenue on November 2, 1868, and replaced in 1883. The Old Colony Railroad was an early proponent of decorating the grounds of its train stations. By 1891, flowers were planted to spell "☾ AVE" at the station.

In the early 1920s, the Boston Elevated Railway (BERy) began planning an extension of the Cambridge–Dorchester Tunnel over the Shawmut Branch to Ashmont. The New York, New Haven, and Hartford Railroad, which had succeeded the Old Colony, sold the Shawmut Branch to the BERy, with service ending on September 6, 1926. The mainline stations at Crescent Avenue and Savin Hill were kept open during construction. Crescent Avenue station was closed on July 15, 1927, for final construction and demolished shortly thereafter.

=== Boston Elevated Railway ===
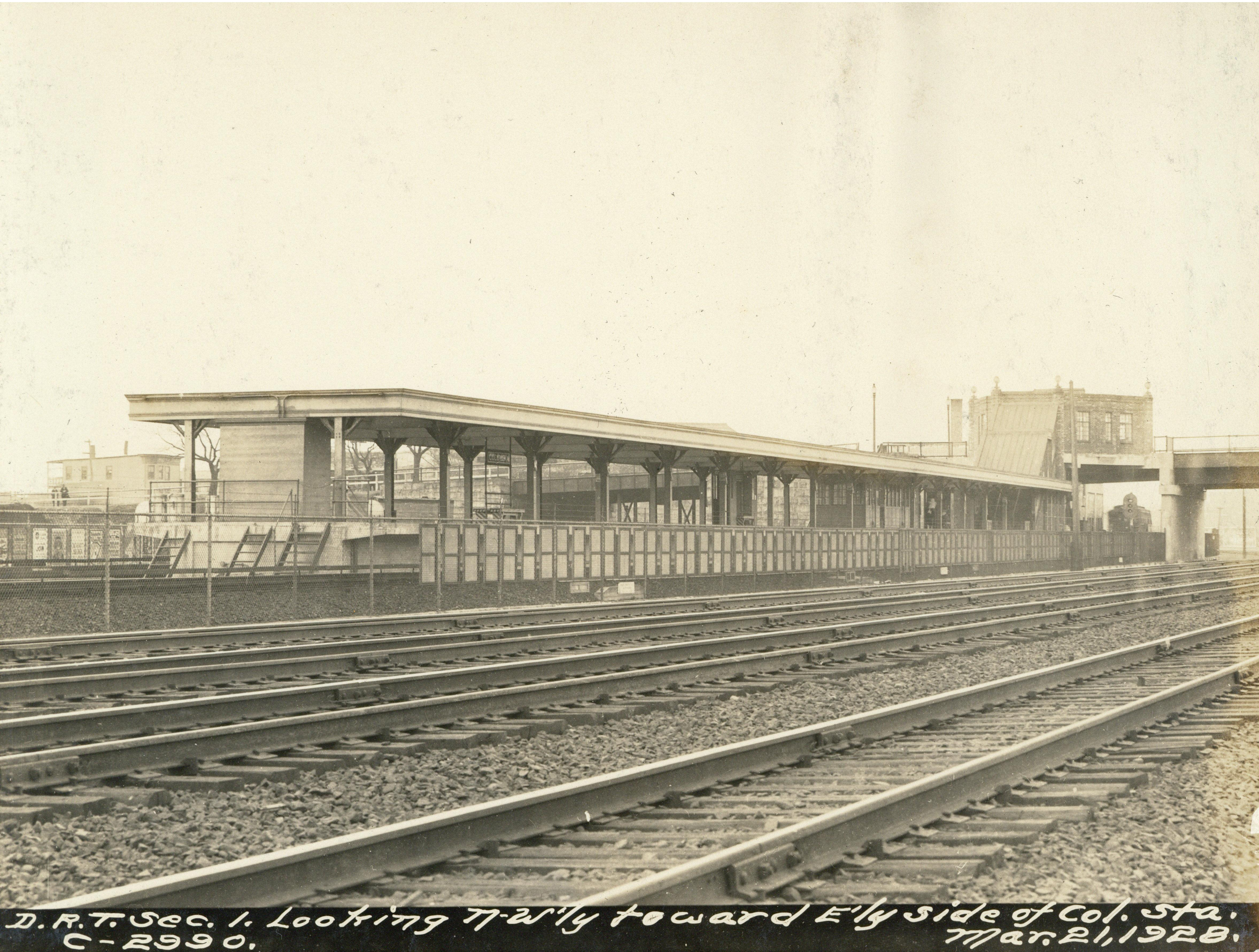
Columbia station in March 1928

Crescent Avenue was replaced with Columbia station, which primarily served the residential areas to the west. The station had a single island platform, 300 feet (91 m) long and varying 20–25 feet (6.1–7.6 m) wide, covered with a full-length reinforced concrete canopy. It was designed to be extended southwards if future ridership required six-car trains. The entrance to the station was from the Columbia Road overpass; like other stations on the Dorchester Extension, it was a rectangular red brick structure with red sandstone and Concord granite trim. The roofs of the headhouse, the stairway to the platform, and the canopy were all flashed with copper. Fare control was in the headhouse, with a waiting room on the platform. The station was designed by William D. Austin.

Construction of the station began in 1925 with the reconstruction of the Columbia Road bridge. The station platform was built in mid-1926. Construction was completed in May 1927; the station was finished during the next several months under the possibility it would open before Savin Hill and Fields Corner. The three stations ultimately opened together on November 5, 1927.

In November 1928, the BERy began construction of a second station entrance from Sydney Street at Crescent Avenue. A footbridge was built over the southbound track at the south end of the station, with fare control located on a short extension of the platform. The new entrance opened on March 18, 1929; by May, it was used by 42% of passengers at the station. In late 1938, the footbridge was extended east over the other tracks to serve a parking area.

=== MBTA era ===
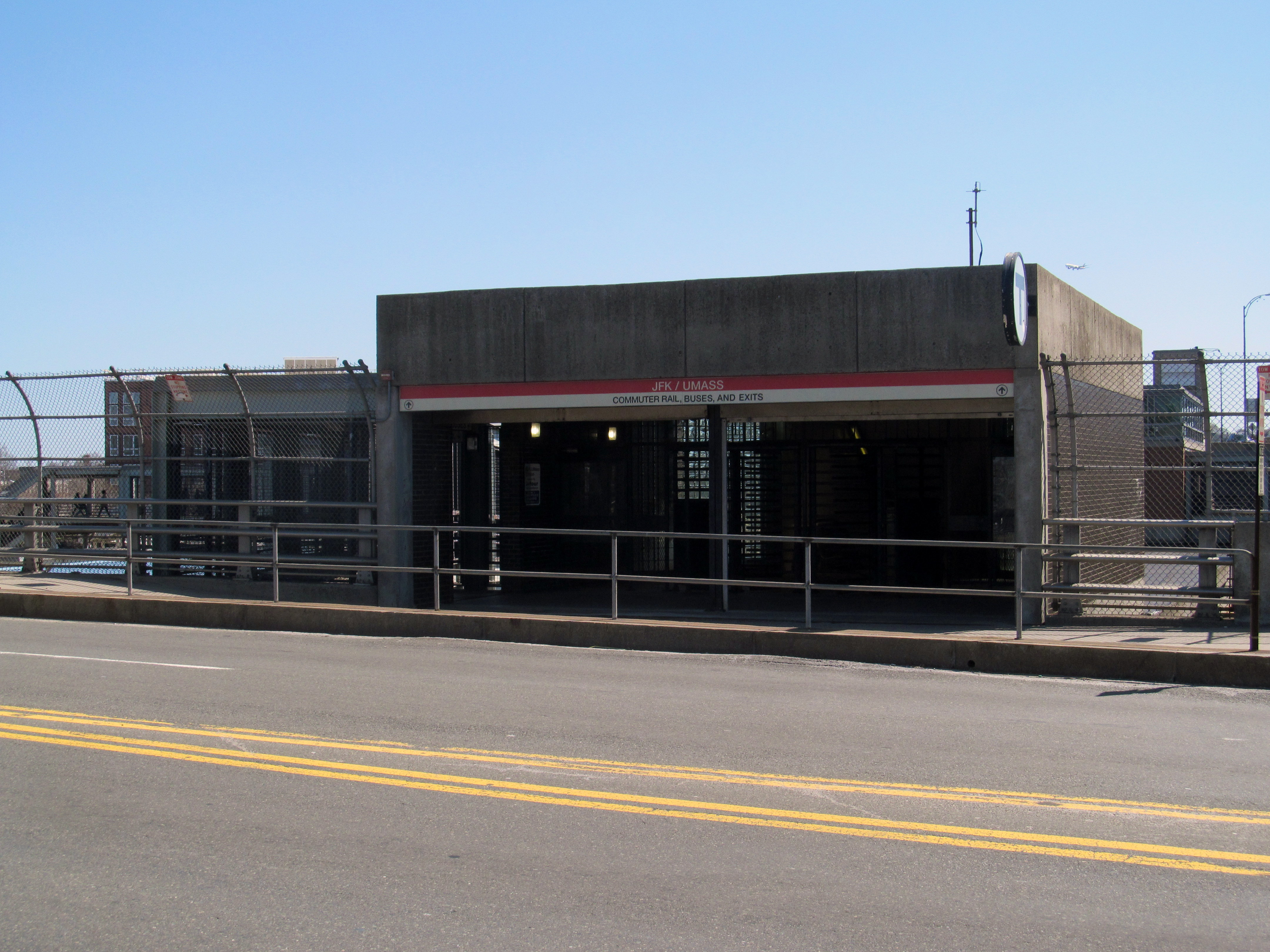
The 1970-built north headhouse

On January 13, 1961, the MTA began operating "modified express service" on the line during the morning rush hour, following the introduction of similar service on the Forest Hills–Everett line the month before. Every other train bypassed Columbia and three other stations. This was discontinued in September 1961 to reduce wait times at the skipped stations, most of which were outdoors.

The New Haven Railroad ended commuter service on the Old Colony lines in 1959, but subway service to Ashmont via Columbia continued. On July 28, 1965, the MBTA signed an agreement with the New Haven Railroad to purchase 11 miles (18 km) of the former Old Colony mainline from Fort Point Channel to South Braintree in order to construct a new rapid transit line along the corridor. The line was expected to be completed within two years. On August 26, 1965, the Cambridge–Dorchester line was renamed as the Red Line as part of a rebranding by the Massachusetts Bay Transportation Authority (MBTA), which had taken over the system in 1964.

In 1967, the MBTA began a station modernization program; modifications to Columbia took place in 1970. A southward extension made the platform long enough for six-car trains (which were not run until 1987). The original brick headhouse was replaced with a plain concrete headhouse, which opened on February 20, 1970, and the platform waiting room was removed. The footbridge was also replaced. The South Shore Branch (later the Braintree Branch) opened in 1971. Trains used two new tracks on the east side of Columbia; they did not stop in order to speed travel time between Quincy and Boston.

==== 1980s ====
The Columbia Point Development opened to the southeast of the station in 1954; residents of the housing development secured the 1962 closure of the city dump, which opened the peninsula to development. Ridership at Columbia station grew quickly despite the MBTA's refusal to have the South Shore Branch stop. Three major developments opening on Columbia Point in the 1970s—the UMass Boston campus in 1974, the John F. Kennedy Presidential Library and Museum in 1979, and the Bayside Expo Center—increased the importance of the station. On December 2, 1982, the station was renamed as JFK/UMass after the campus and library. Columbia was re-added as a secondary name in 1985 as part of a series of station name changes. Repairs to the Columbia Road bridge closed the north entrance from early 1982 until January 10, 1983.

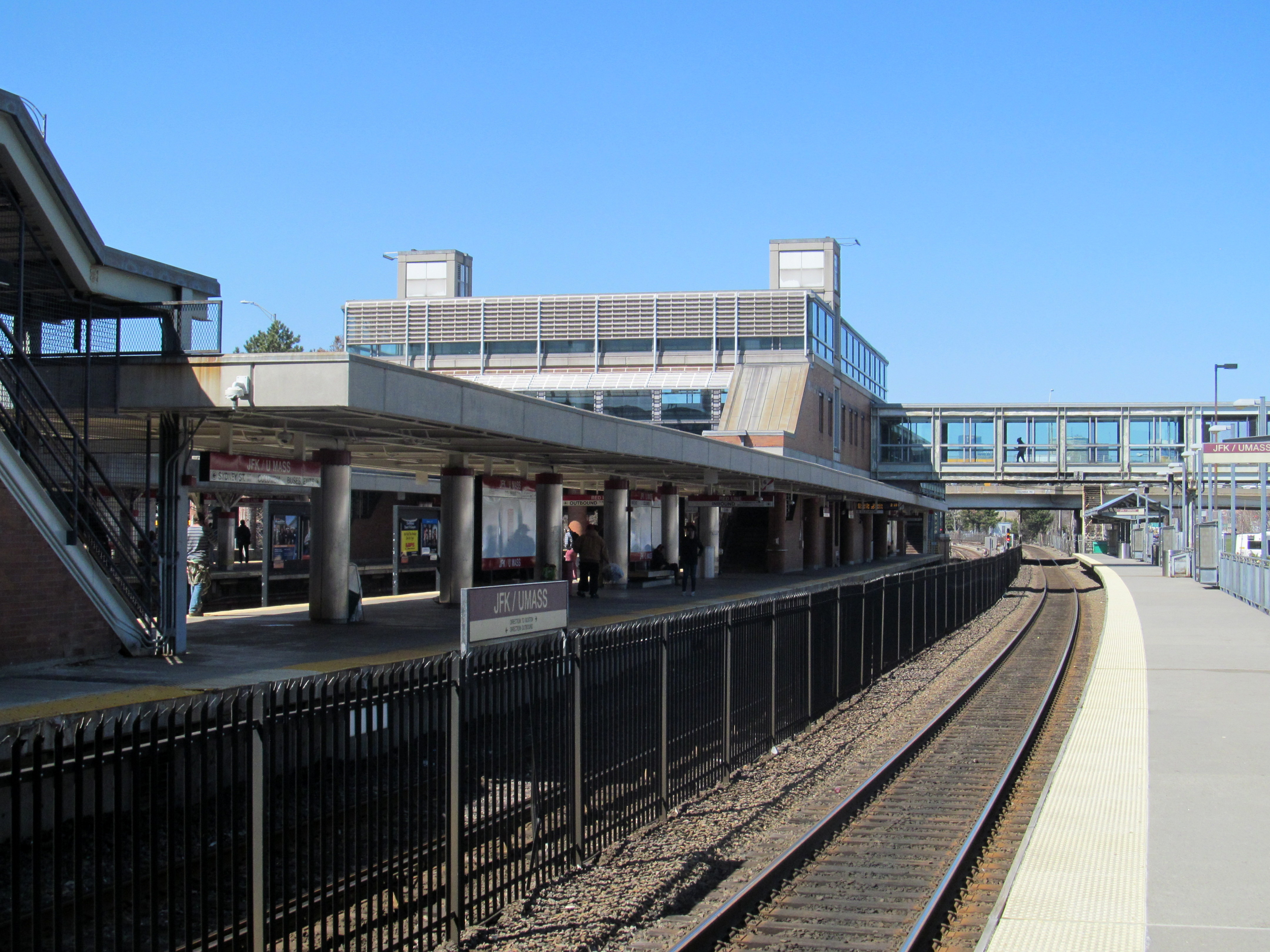
The Braintree Branch platform and the overhead waiting room (left) opened in 1988, while the commuter platform (right) opened in 2001

In January 1980, the MBTA indicated that a $1 million renovation of the station, including a second platform, would be completed in 1982. However, the project proved controversial; residents near Savin Hill station instead wanted a flyover there so that Braintree Branch trains would stop at both Savin Hill and JFK/UMass. State officials insisted that the flyover would be significantly more expensive than the second platform, and that five times as many South Shore riders were riding to JFK/UMass as to Savin Hill.

The MBTA awarded a $13.5 million construction contract on February 4, 1987, and work began that June. A groundbreaking ceremony was held on July 16. A large waiting room and fare control lobby was built over the center of the platforms, with footbridges to Sydney Street on the west and a new busway on the east. The 1970s Columbia Road entrance became exit-only; an adjacent footbridge to the lobby was added. The south footbridge was modified with a connection to the new platform, and became exit-only. The east part of the footbridge was removed and an employee building constructed in its place. The platform for the Braintree Branch opened on December 14, 1988, allowing all Red Line trains to stop at the renovated station. The renovation included elevators to both platforms, making the station accessible.

==== 2000s ====
Commuter rail service on the Middleborough/Lakeville and Plymouth/Kingston lines was restored in September 1997. The MBTA initially did not plan to include a stop at JFK/UMass; not until November 1996 did the agency agree to build the platform. Construction on the $2.3 million project began in 2000. Trains began stopping on April 30, 2001. This was the first time that mainline commuter trains stopped at the station since 1927. Several rush-hour Greenbush Line trains began to stop concurrent with that line's restoration in 2007. Not all commuter trains on the line stopped at JFK/UMass, however, because the station is in a single-tracked bottleneck section of the otherwise double-tracked route. All weekend trains, however, stopped at the station prior to July 2025 due to the more limited weekend schedule.

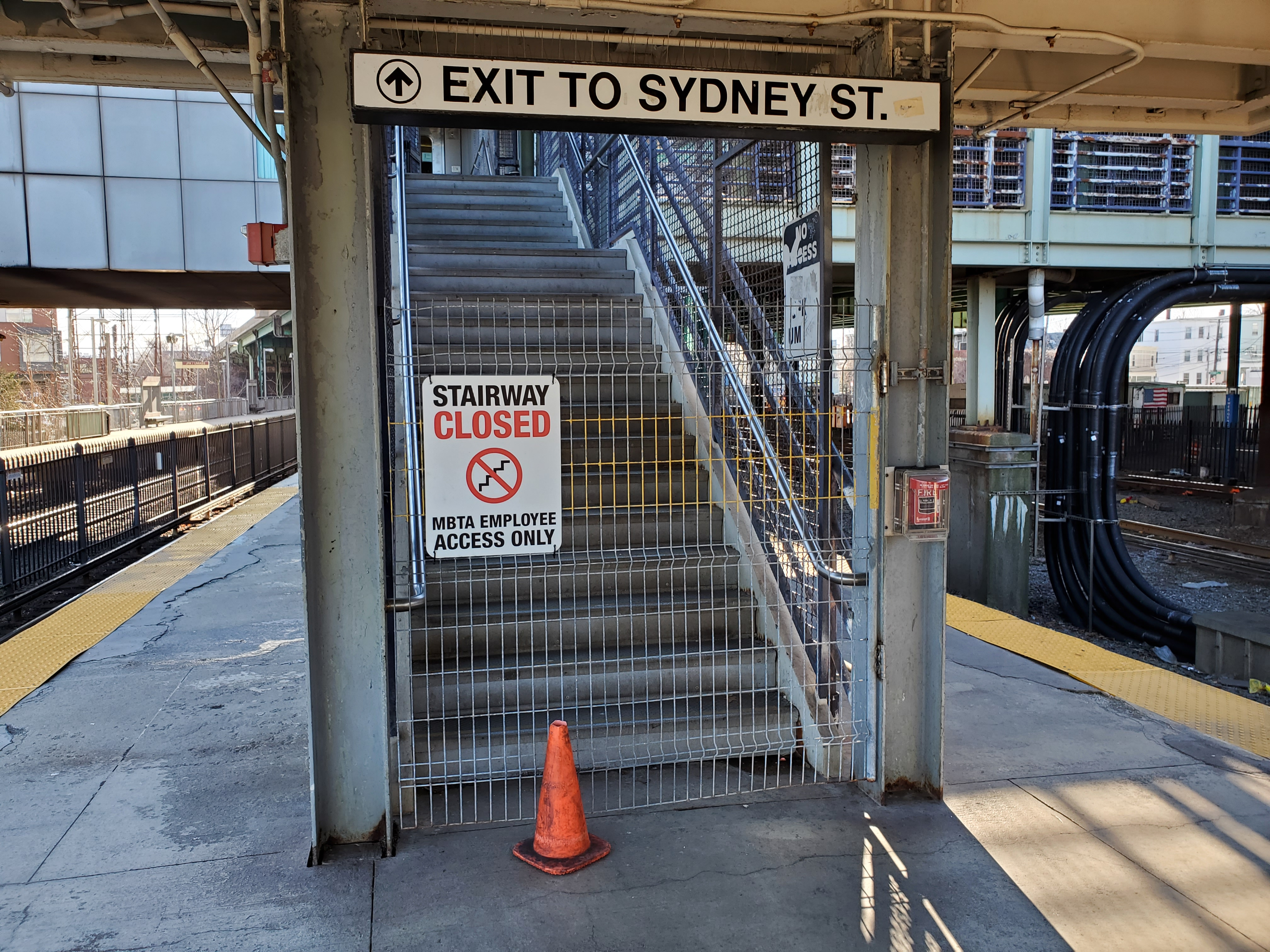
Closed south stairs in December 2022

JFK/UMass station was a proposed stop on the MBTA's planned Urban Ring Project. The Urban Ring was to be a bus rapid transit (BRT) line designed to connect the current MBTA lines to reduce strain on the downtown stations. Under 2008 plans, the Urban Ring would access the station via Columbia Road, with a one-bay dedicated BRT platform in the existing busway. The project was cancelled in January 2010. In 2012 and 2013, the MBTA installed over 50 security cameras in the station—in addition to over ten already present—in response to an increase of crime in nearby areas. Improvements to the station were proposed in 2014 as part of the city's bid for the 2024 Olympics, which was withdrawn in 2015.

On June 11, 2019, a Red Line train derailed just north of JFK/UMass station due to a broken axle, damaging three sheds of signal equipment that control the nearby Columbia Junction. The Red Line was limited to 10 trains per hour (instead of the usual 13–14) for three months while repairs were made. Full service resumed on September 25, 2019.

Structural deterioration affected the station entrances in the early 2020s. On January 29, 2020, the stairs between Columbia Road and the east side of the station were taken out of service for repairs. Boston University professor David K. Jones was killed when he fell through a missing section of the still-closed stairs (owned by the Department of Conservation and Recreation) on September 11, 2021. The stairs from the east footbridge to the busway were closed from May to September 2022, and the southern stairs to Sydney Street were indefinitely closed in mid-2022. In November 2022, the MBTA closed the Columbia Road entrance, with repairs initially expected to take at least a month. Part of the Red Line was closed for a weekend in January 2023 to accommodate repairs. The Columbia Road entrance reopened that month.

The MBTA included $2.3 million in its draft fiscal year 2024–2028 capital plan for a planning study to redesign the station. Buses replaced service on the Ashmont Branch from October 14–29, 2023, to allow for track work. Repairs and repainting of the Red Line platforms at JFK/UMass station was also performed during the closure. In November 2024, the MBTA applied for a $99 million federal grant to fund half of a renovation of the station. In January 2025, the U.S. Department of Transportation did not approve the MBTA's petition but did award a $2 million grant for planning and design work at the station.

Off-peak and weekend commuter rail trains no longer stop at JFK/UMass effective July 21, 2025, leaving only peak-hour peak-direction stops. The change was intended to improve reliability on the lines, which had been lowered after the South Coast Rail extension opened.
