= Savin Hill station =

Rapid transit station in Boston, Massachusetts, US

Savin Hill
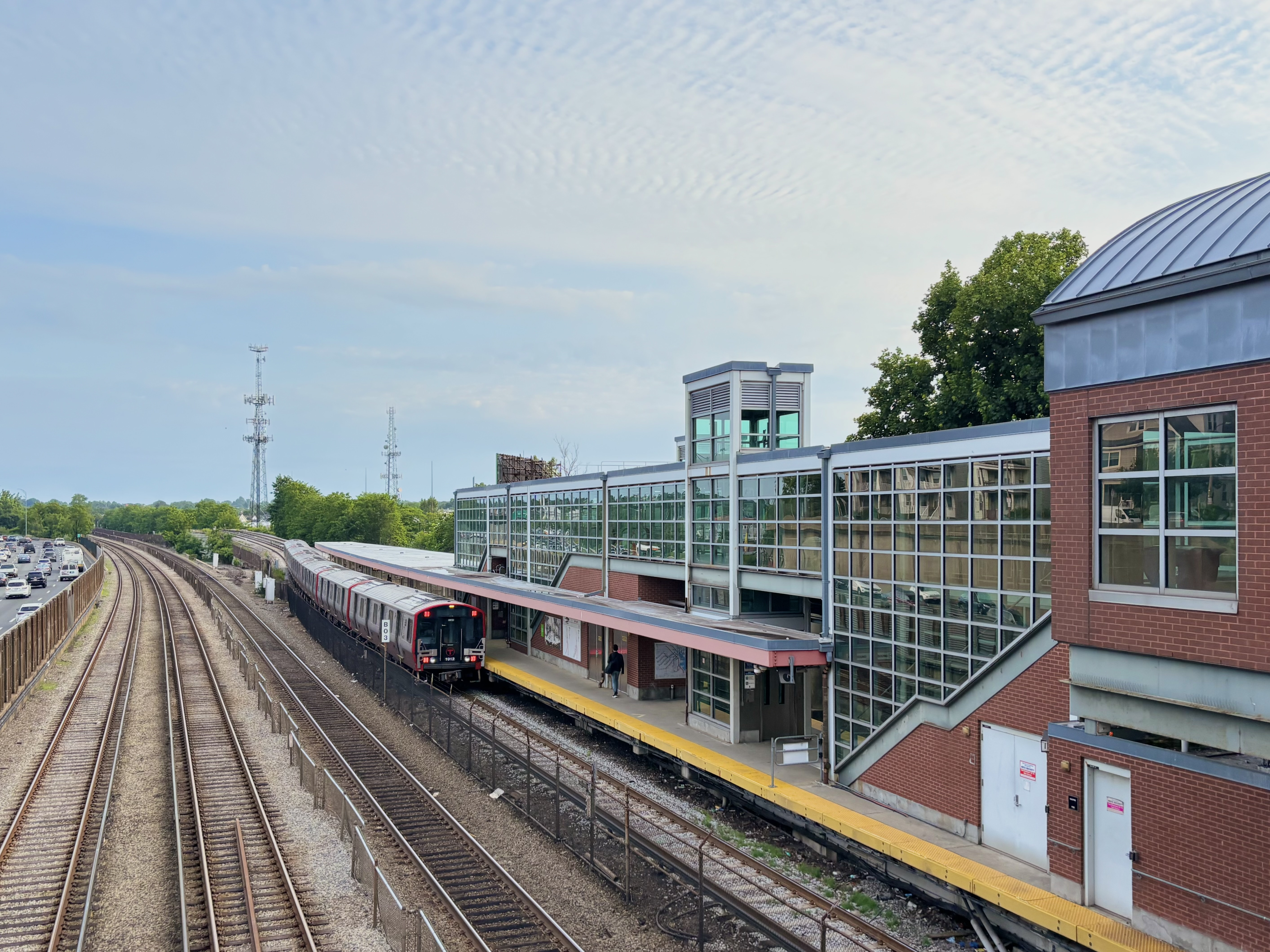
- A northbound train arriving at Savin Hill station in June 2025

General information
- Location: 121 Savin Hill Avenue; Boston, Massachusetts
- Coordinates: 42°18′39″N 71°03′13″W
- Line: Ashmont branch
- Platforms: 1 island platform
- Tracks: 2

Construction
- Parking: 20 spaces
- Accessible: Yes

History
- Opened: November 1845 (original station); November 5, 1927 (rapid transit)
- Closed: 1926 (original station)
- Rebuilt: May 9, 2004–July 31, 2005

Passengers
- FY2019: 2,199 boardings (weekday average)

Services
Preceding station	MBTA	Following station
JFK/UMass toward Alewife	Red Line	Fields Corner toward Ashmont
Former services
Preceding station	New York, New Haven and Hartford Railroad	Following station
Crescent Avenue toward Boston	Boston–Mattapan	Harrison Square toward Mattapan
Crescent Avenue toward Boston	Boston–Braintree	Harrison Square toward Braintree
Track layout
Location

Savin Hill station is a rapid transit station in Boston, Massachusetts. It serves the Ashmont branch of the MBTA's Red Line. It is located at 121 Savin Hill Avenue adjacent to Sydney Street in the Savin Hill area of the Dorchester neighborhood. Opened in 1845 as a commuter rail station, Savin Hill was converted to rapid transit in 1927 and rebuilt in 2004–05 for accessibility. Averaging 2,199 daily boardings by a FY 2019 count, Savin Hill is the least-used station on the Red Line.

== Station layout ==
Five tracks pass roughly north-south through the station area, which is located on the west side of the Southeast Expressway. The island platform serving the two-track Ashmont Branch is on the west side of the alignment, with the single commuter rail track and the two Braintree Branch tracks to the east. The main entrance to the station is at the north end of the platform from the Savin Hill Avenue overpass; a secondary entrance is located on South Sydney Street.

== History ==
=== Old Colony Railroad ===
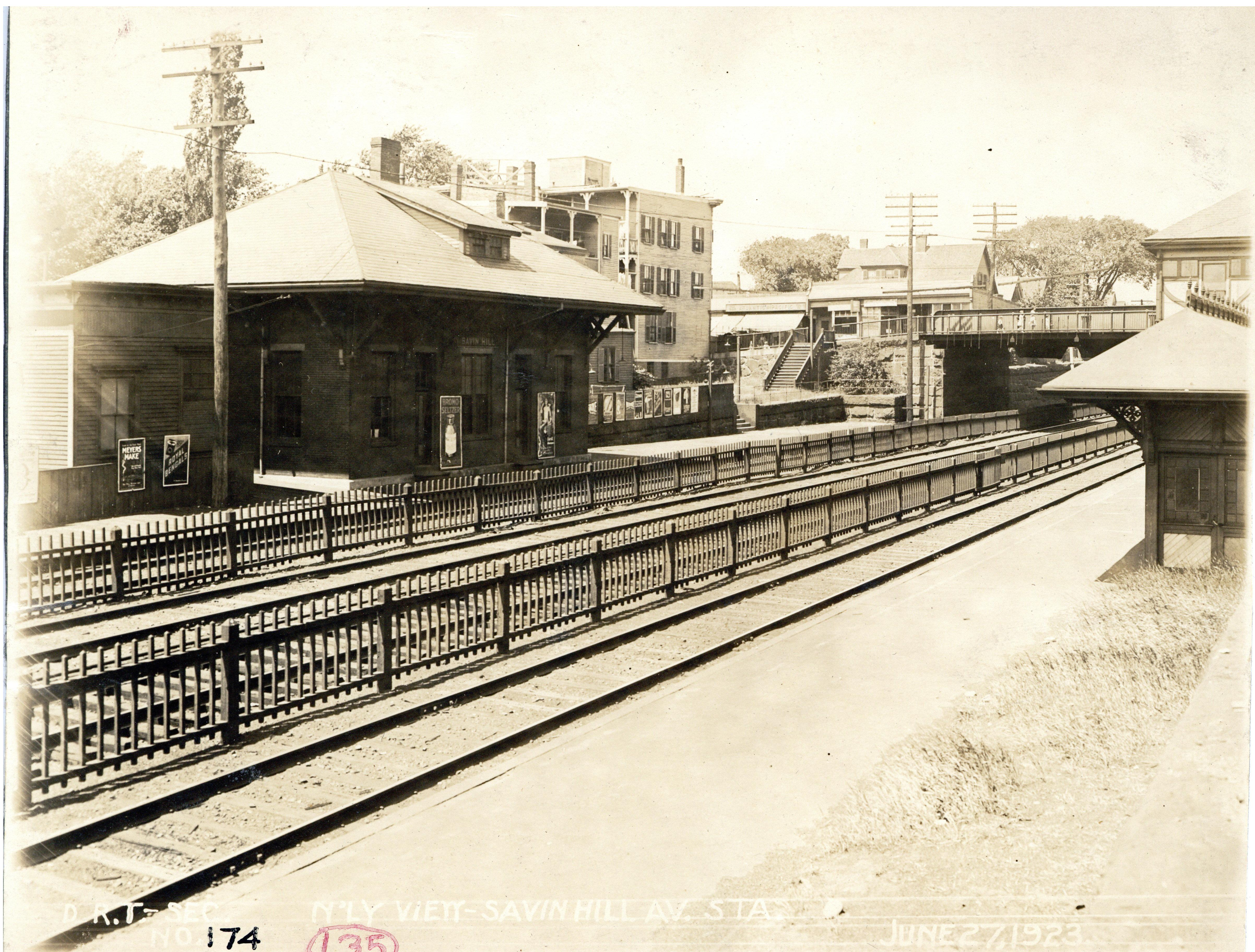
Savin Hill Avenue station in 1923, four years before the conversion to rapid transit

The Old Colony Railroad opened from Plymouth to South Boston in November 1845. Savin Hill was a flag stop for South Braintree and Dorchester and Milton Branch trains by 1848. A station building was located just north of the modern location by 1852. The station was moved to its modern location just south of Savin Hill Avenue by 1874. The Old Colony constructed a new brick station building in 1881. It was located on the west side of the tracks (the inbound side, as the Old Colony had left-hand running until 1895), with a wooden building on the east side. After the line was quadruple-tracked, the station was served only by local trains on the outer tracks, while express trains used the inner tracks.

=== Conversion to rapid transit ===
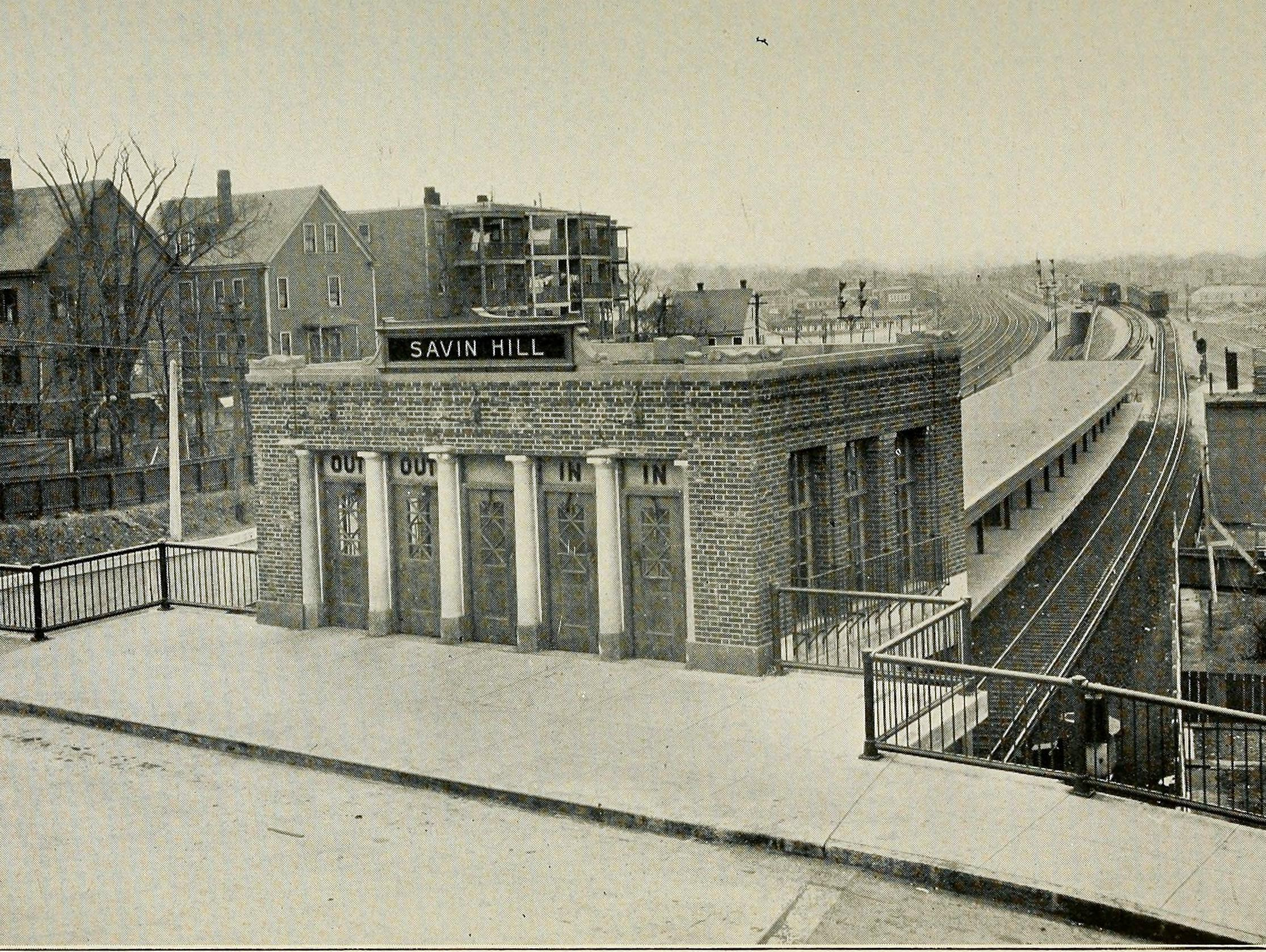
The newly-constructed station in 1927

Commuter rail service on the Shawmut Branch ended in September 1926. The Boston Elevated Railway, which had bought the line, began converting it into the Dorchester Extension, a rapid transit extension of the Cambridge-Dorchester Tunnel line. Savin Hill, located on the Old Colony mainline, was rebuilt as a rapid transit station as part of the extension. The commuter rail platforms and station buildings were removed, though a temporary station was used until November 1, 1927 (outbound) and November 4 (inbound). The Savin Hill rapid transit station opened on November 5, 1927, along with Columbia and Fields Corner as part of the first phase of the extension.

In 1934, the Boston Elevated Railway requested the addition of a busway on the west side of the station. Construction on the busway and a pedestrian overpass to the platform began in August and finished in December 1934. Fare control was relocated to the platform level; a platform extension to the south was constructed – without interrupting train service – to accommodate this.

On January 13, 1961, the MTA began operating "modified express service" on the line during the morning rush hour, following the introduction of similar service on the Forest Hills–Everett line the month before. Every other train bypassed Savin Hill and three other stations. This was discontinued in September 1961 to reduce wait times at the skipped stations, most of which were outdoors.

Savin Hill is not directly served by any MBTA bus routes. Until the 1960s, four bus routes including the 18 terminated at Savin Hill. However, the M.T.A. desired to build a parking lot at the Savin Hill busway location. In September and December 1962, the 13 and 14 routes were rerouted away from Savin Hill to keep buses off local streets, while the 12 and 18 were combined into the modern 18 route.

Savin Hill station was further modified with the removal of the waiting room in the 1970s, renovations in 1982–83, and a platform extension in the late 1980s to allow 6-car trains. By the end of the century, however, it was in poor condition and still contained the most original structure of any of the pre-war stations on the line. Savin Hill, Fields Corner, and Shawmut stations had not been retrofitted for accessibility by that time.

=== 2004–05 reconstruction ===
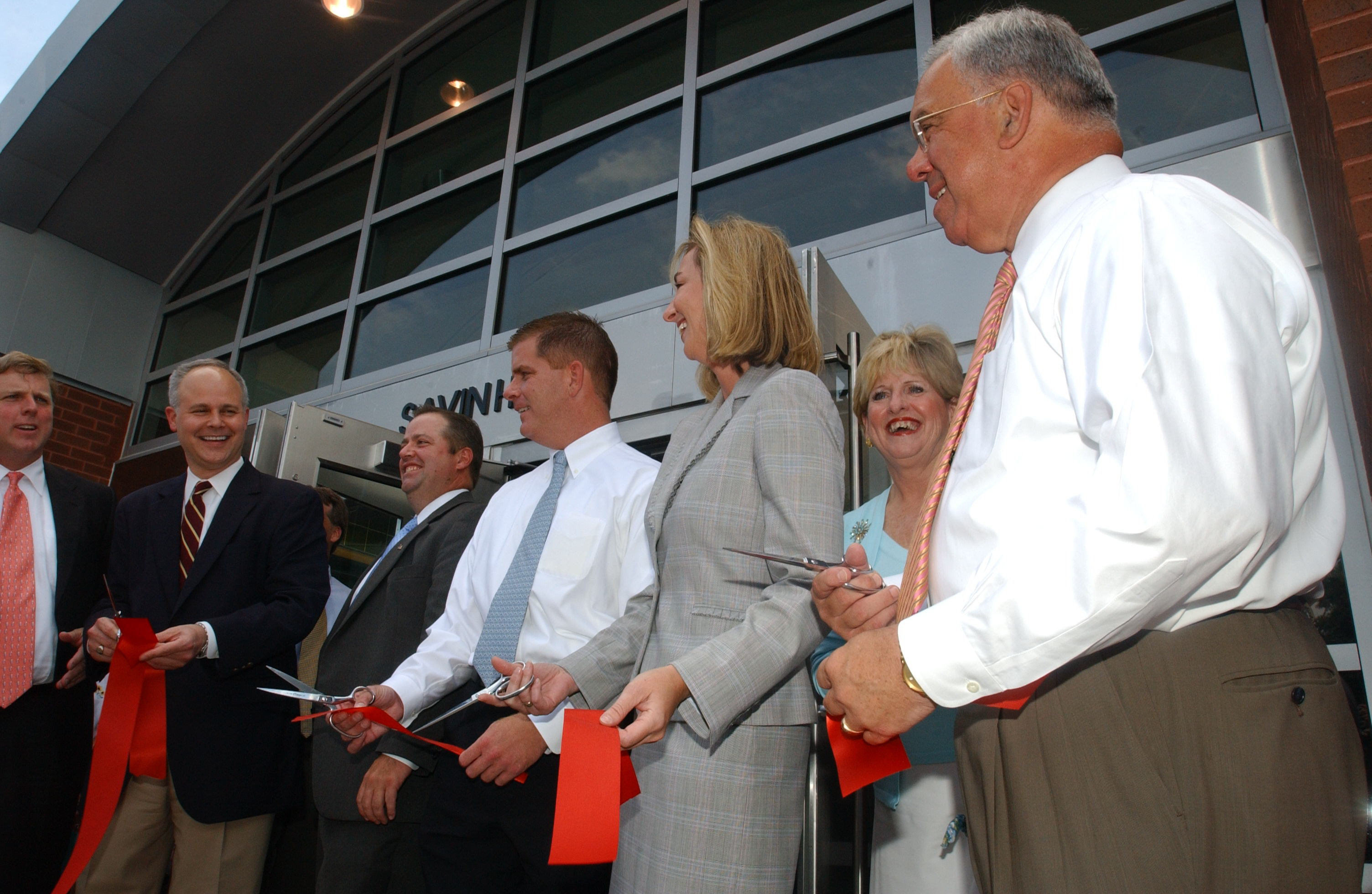
The ribbon cutting ceremony for the renovated station in August 2005

The MBTA broke ground for the Red Line Rehabilitation Project – a $67 million reconstruction of Shawmut, Fields Corner, and Savin Hill stations – in October 2003. Construction began in March 2004. The 1927-built station was closed on May 9, 2004, and was completely razed to make way for the new ADA-compliant station which involved adding elevators for full accessibility. A bus shuttle was run from JFK/UMass station during the 14-month closure, which ended with the opening of the new station on July 31, 2005. The closure was originally scheduled to last 10 months, but was delayed by inclement weather and slow procurement of structural steel. Most of the station was complete by April 2005; however, it could not be reopened until the accessible elevators and escalators were completed. Original plans to include public art as part of the Arts on the Line program were removed in budget cuts; only historical interpretive panels were installed.

Buses again replaced service on the Ashmont Branch from October 14–29, 2023, to allow for track work. Stairway replacement at Savin Hill station was also performed during the closure.
