= Fields Corner station =

Rapid transit station in Boston, Massachusetts, US

Fields Corner
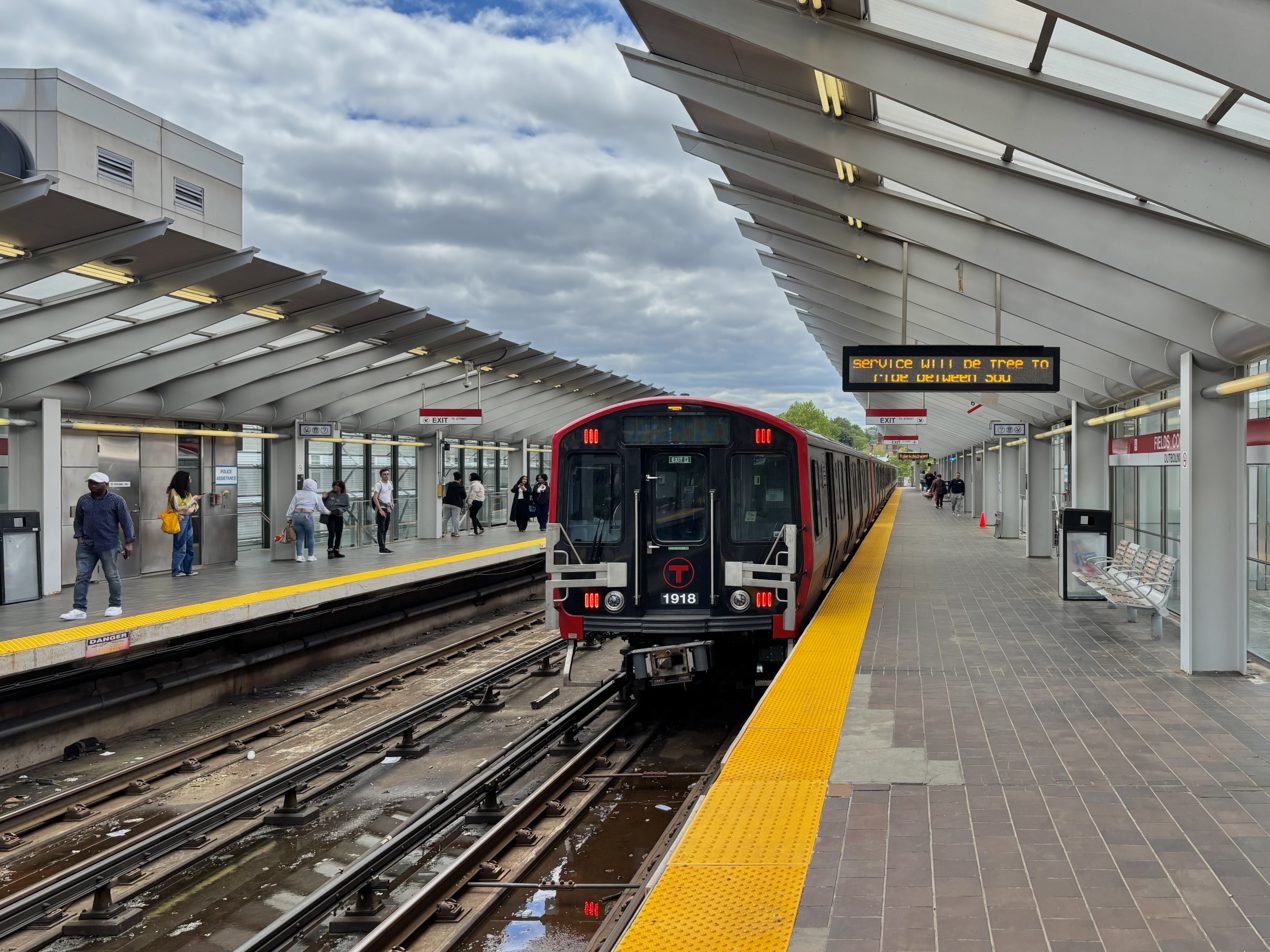
- A southbound train leaving Fields Corner station in June 2025

General information
- Location: 50 Freeman Street; Dorchester, Boston, Massachusetts
- Coordinates: 42.3000°N 71.0620°W
- Line: Ashmont Branch (Shawmut Branch)
- Platforms: 2 side platforms
- Tracks: 2
- Connections: MBTA bus: 15, 17, 18, 19, 201, 202, 210

Construction
- Structure type: Elevated
- Accessible: Yes

History
- Opened: November 5, 1927
- Rebuilt: March 2004–September 23, 2008

Passengers
- FY2019: 4,948 daily boardings

Services
Preceding station	MBTA	Following station
Shawmut toward Ashmont	Red Line	Savin Hill toward Alewife
Former services
Preceding station	New York, New Haven and Hartford Railroad	Following station
Shawmut toward Mattapan	Boston–Mattapan	Harrison Square toward Boston
Location

Fields Corner station is a rapid transit station on the Ashmont branch of the Massachusetts Bay Transportation Authority (MBTA) Red Line, located in the Fields Corner district of Dorchester, Boston, Massachusetts. It is a major transfer point for MBTA bus service, serving routes 15, 17, 18, 19, 201, 202, and 210. The station opened in 1927 and was completely rebuilt from 2004 to 2008, making it fully accessible.

== History ==
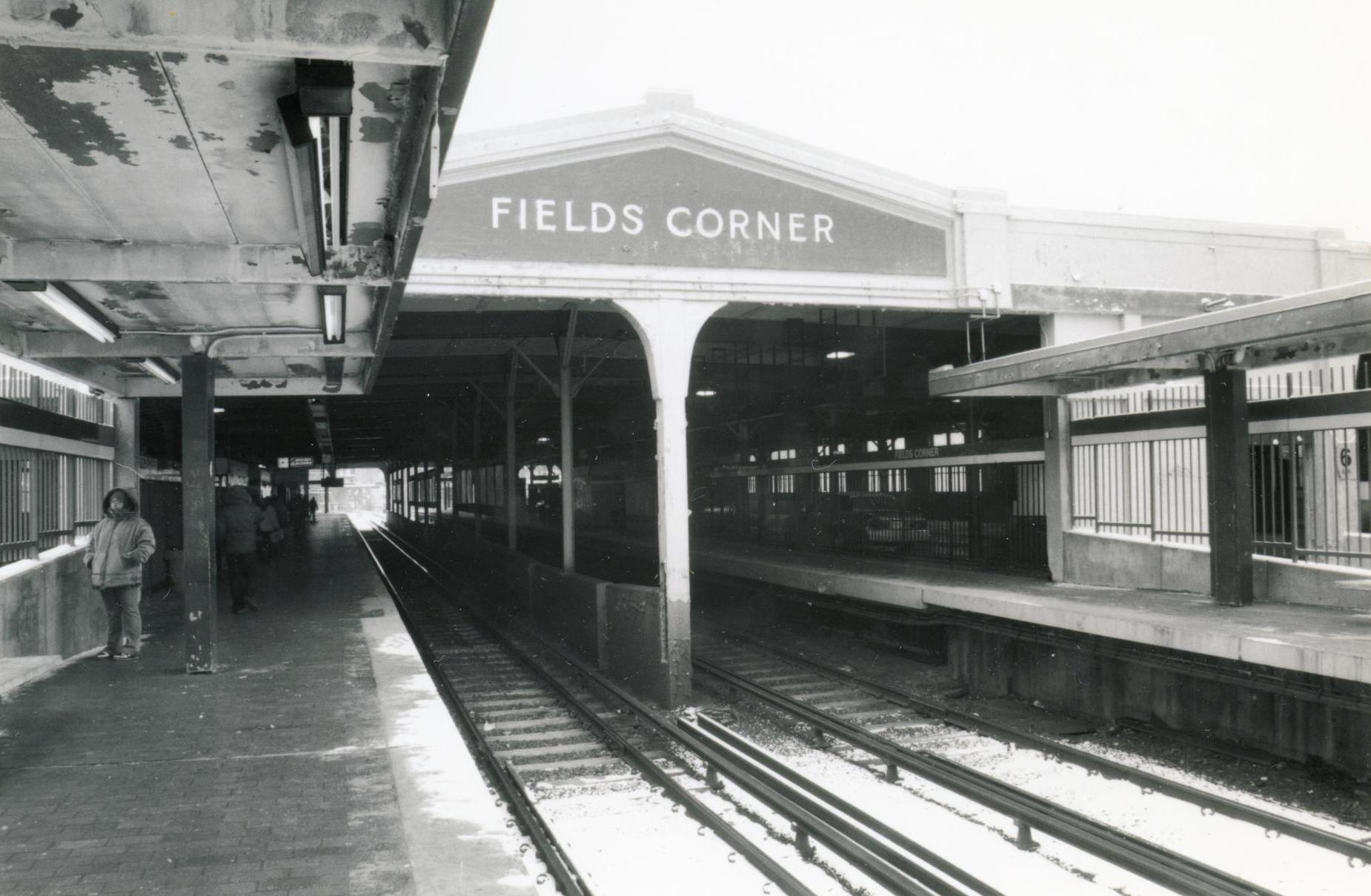
The 1927-built station in 2004

Fields Corner and Savin Hill stations opened on November 5, 1927. Fields Corner was the southern terminus of the line for about a year until Shawmut and Ashmont station opened in 1928. The elevated station was designed for efficient transfer between rapid transit trains and surface streetcars and buses. It had two island platforms with the rapid transit tracks in the center and the streetcar tracks on the outside (two tracks on the north side). A busway (later closed) was located at ground level on the south side of the station.

The pedestrian tunnel from Charles Street was controversially closed in January 1970 due to crime and vandalism. In 1982, the platforms were extended for six-car trains, which were introduced in 1988. Interior renovations took place in 1983.

The MBTA issued a $4.3 million design contract for renovations of Ashmont, Shawmut, and Fields Corner stations on May 3, 2001. Shawmut and Fields Corner reached 100% design by January 10, 2003; Ashmont was delayed due to design changes. The MBTA broke ground for the Red Line Rehabilitation Project – a $67 million reconstruction of Shawmut, Fields Corner, and Savin Hill stations – in October 2003.

Construction began in March 2004. The renovations changed the layout of the station, with a new fare lobby under the tracks. Original plans to include public art as part of the Arts on the Line program were removed in budget cuts; only historical interpretive panels were installed. The new entrance lobby opened on December 22, 2006, making it the final fare-controlled station on the MBTA to be converted to use the CharlieCard-based automated fare collection system. The station renovation was completed on September 23, 2008.

Buses replaced service on the Ashmont Branch from October 14–29, 2023, to allow for track work.
