= Ashmont station =

Rapid transit station in Boston, Massachusetts, US

Ashmont
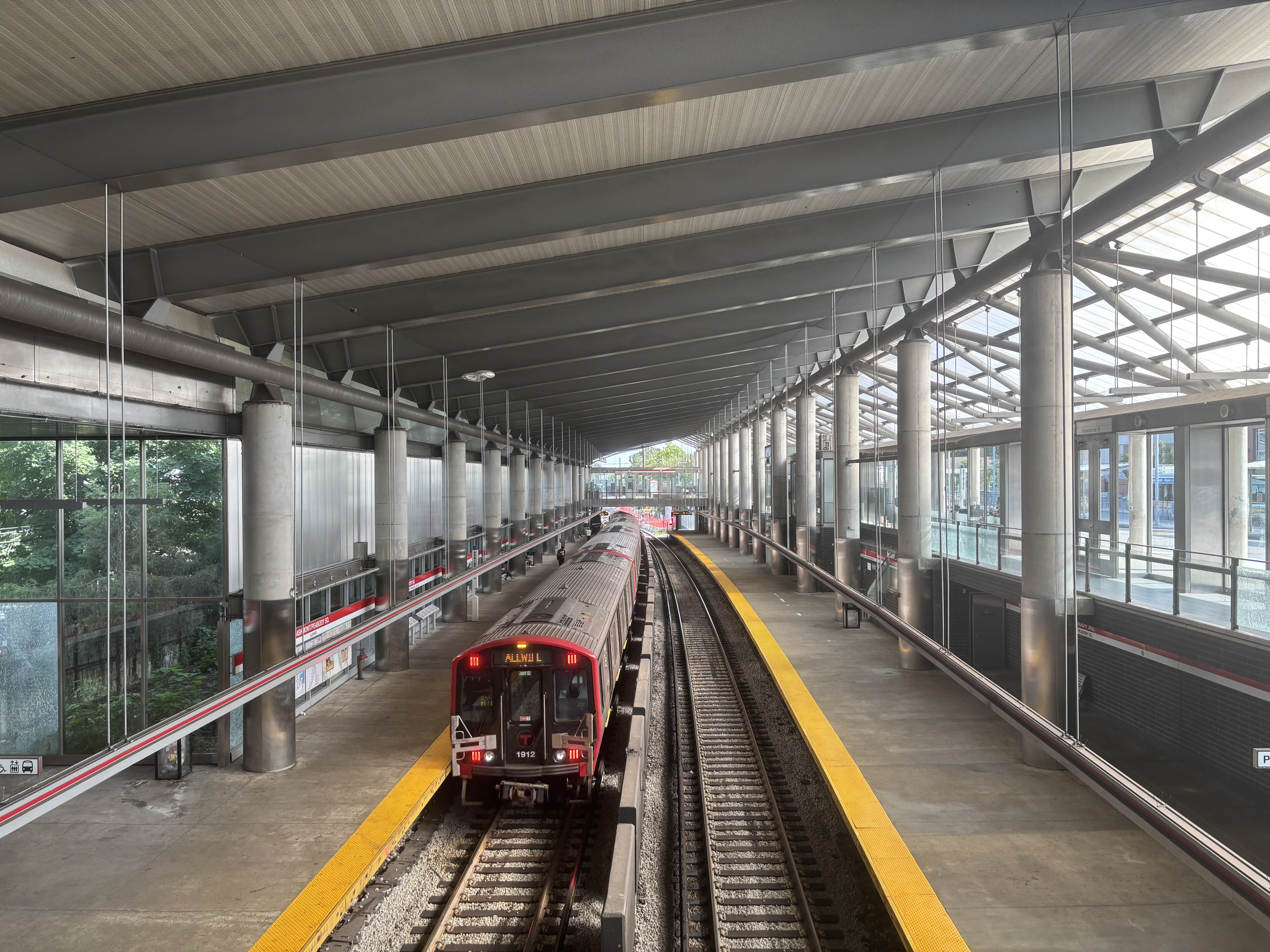
- An inbound Red Line train entering Ashmont station in 2025

General information
- Location: Dorchester Avenue at Ashmont Street; Dorchester, Boston, Massachusetts
- Coordinates: 42.2846°N 71.0638°W
- Line: Ashmont Branch (Shawmut Branch)
- Platforms: 2 side platforms (Red Line); 1 side platform (Mattapan Line)
- Tracks: 2 (Red Line); 1 balloon loop (Mattapan Line)
- Connections: MBTA bus: 18, 21, 22, 23, 24, 26, 215, 217, 240; BAT: 12

Construction
- Cycle facilities: "Pedal and Park" bicycle cage
- Accessible: Yes

History
- Opened: September 1, 1928 (Red Line); August 26, 1929 (Mattapan Line)
- Rebuilt: September 2004–October 21, 2011

Passengers
- FY2019: 8,841 daily boardings

Services
| Preceding station | MBTA | Following station |
|---|---|---|
| Terminus | Red Line | Shawmut toward Alewife |
| Cedar Grove toward Mattapan | Mattapan Line | Terminus |
Former services
| Preceding station | New York, New Haven and Hartford Railroad | Following station |
|---|---|---|
| Cedar Grove toward Mattapan | Boston–Mattapan | Shawmut toward Boston |
Track layout
Location

Ashmont station (signed as Ashmont/Peabody Sq.) is a Massachusetts Bay Transportation Authority (MBTA) intermodal transit station located at Peabody Square in the Dorchester neighborhood of Boston, Massachusetts. It is the southern terminus of the Ashmont branch of the rapid transit Red Line, the northern terminus of the connecting light rail Mattapan Line, and a major terminal for MBTA bus service. Ashmont has two side platforms serving the below-grade Red Line and a single side platform on an elevated balloon loop for the Mattapan Line. The station is fully accessible for all modes.

== Station design ==
The station busway in 2026

Ashmont station has two below-street-level side platforms for the Red Line, which runs northwest–southeast through the station. The outbound platform, only used by terminating trains, is outside the paid area. Fare mezzanines are located above both ends of the platforms. Elevators connect both mezzanines to the inbound platforms; an elevator in the center of the outbound platform connects to a walkway to the south mezzanine. The Mattapan Line runs on an elevated balloon loop at the south end of the station, with a single side platform connected to the south mezzanine outside fare control.

A two-lane busway runs along the west side of the station at street level. The main entrance from Peabody Square leads to the north fare mezzanine; the south fare mezzanine entrance is from the busway, with a sidewalk to Dorchester Avenue. A secondary entrance from Radford Lane leads directly to the south end of the inbound platform, and a secondary exit leads from the south end of the outbound platform to Beale Street.

Ashmont is a major terminal for the MBTA bus system, with nine local routes – 18, 21, 22, 23, 24, 26, 215, 217, and 240 – serving the station busway. The Brockton Area Transit Authority (BAT) operates its route 12 to Ashmont – one of the only non-MBTA routes running to an MBTA rapid transit station.

== History ==
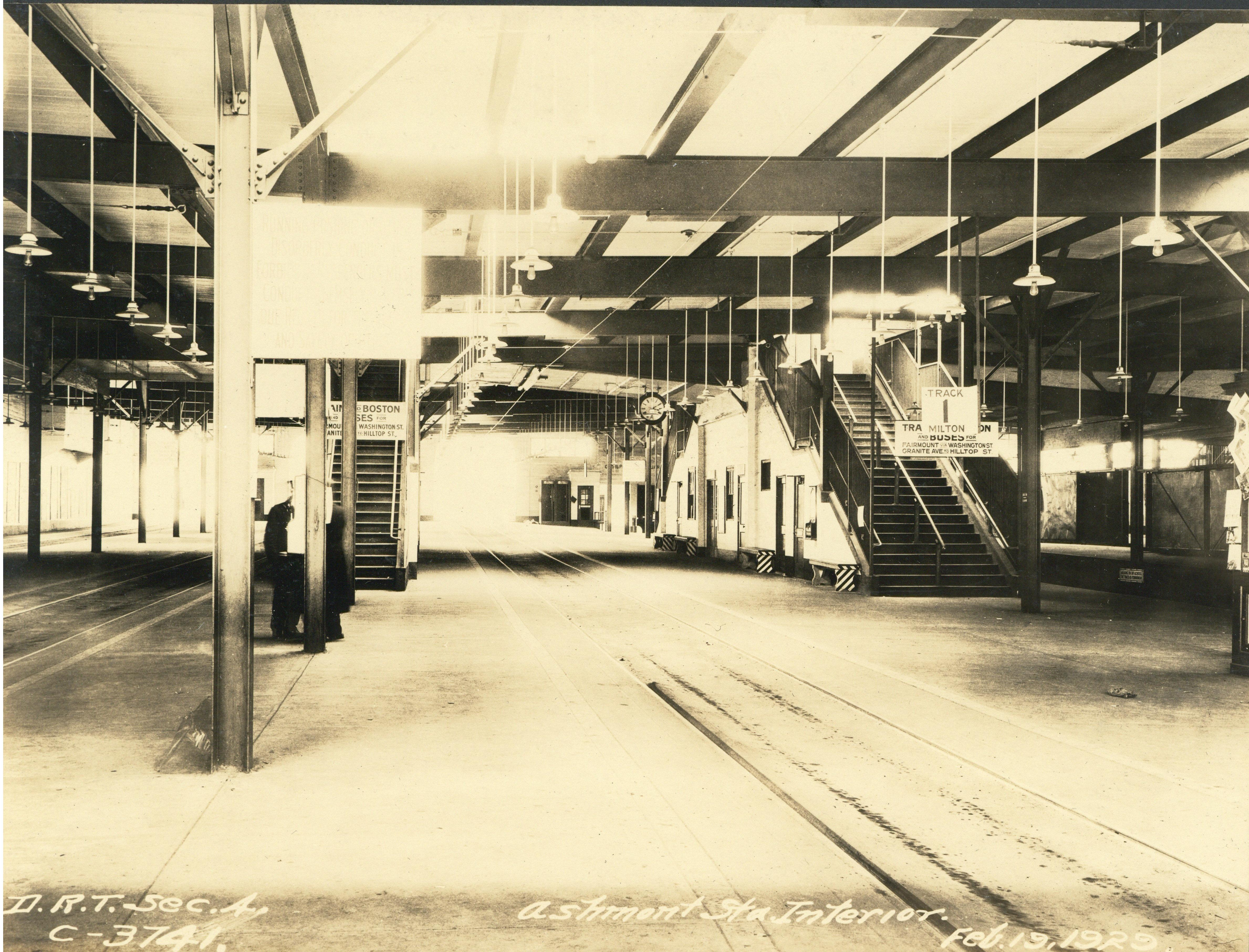
Streetcar loading platforms at the Ashmont station in 1929

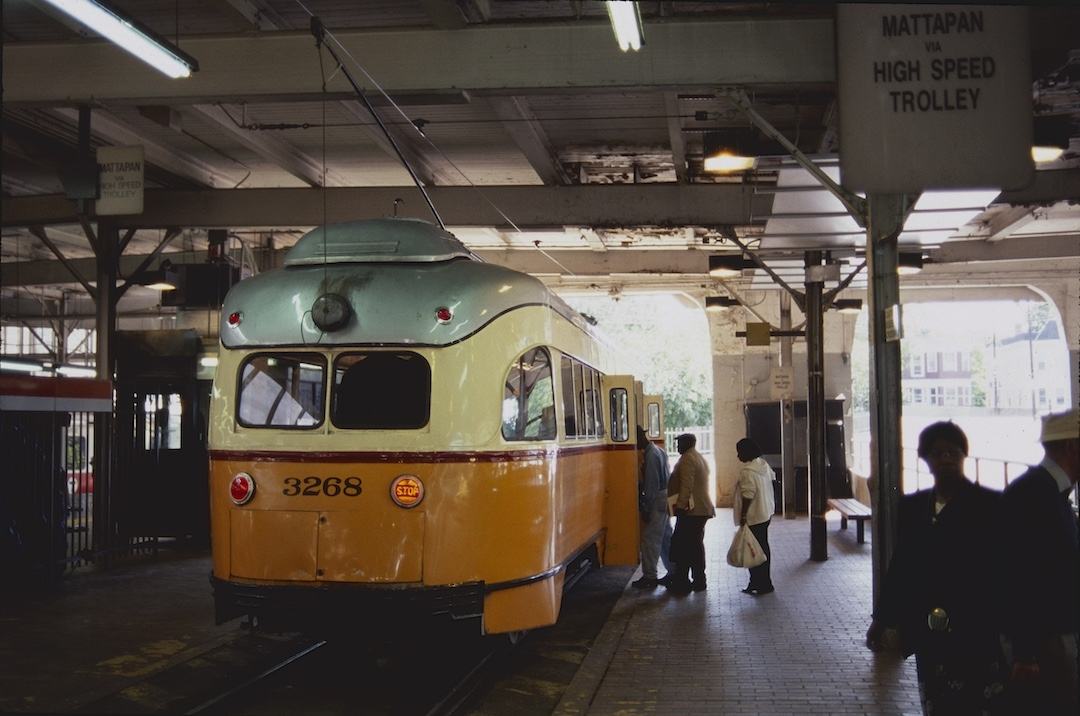
Riders boarding at the original streetcar loading platform in 2004, before its 2007 relocation

The first Ashmont station was a simple building along the original Shawmut Branch of the Old Colony Railroad, which opened in 1872. Service on the branch ended in 1926 as the Boston Elevated Railway constructed its Dorchester Extension. Ashmont and Shawmut stations opened on September 1, 1928, with Ashmont the terminal station. Like Fields Corner, Ashmont was designed for convenient transfer between rapid transit trains and surface streetcars. It had two island platforms with rapid transit on the inner tracks and streetcars on the outer tracks, allowing cross-platform transfers in both directions. Several streetcar lines were replaced with buses shortly after the station opened, using a surface-level busway on the west side of the station.

In 1929, the Eastern Massachusetts Street Railway began operating bus service to Ashmont; unlike Fields Corner and Mattapan, it was never served by Eastern Mass streetcars. The Eastern Mass eventually operated three bus routes out of Ashmont, all of which became MBTA bus routes in 1971: to Brockton (now route 240), to Quincy via Granite Avenue (215), and to Quincy via Adams Street (217). The remaining surface streetcar lines running to Ashmont were gradually replaced by buses, with the final two (routes 22 and 23) replaced by trolleybuses in 1949. The grade-separated Mattapan Line continued streetcar operation. From 1948 to 1968, Hudson Bus Lines operated service from Ashmont to several South Shore locations.

A modernization of Ashmont station was completed in 1976. It included closure of the original Peabody Square headhouse and connecting passages in December 1975 due to safety concerns. In 1981, the platforms were extended for six-car trains, which were introduced in 1988. The platforms were refurbished in 1987. The station was made accessible during those renovations, though the 1990 passage of the Americans with Disabilities Act created stricter standards.

=== Reconstruction ===
The MBTA issued a $4.3 million design contract for renovations of Ashmont, Shawmut, and Fields Corner stations on May 3, 2001; the Ashmont portion was $1.3 million. The agency issued a request for proposals for transit-oriented development on an adjacent MBTA-owned 0.69-acre (2,800 m^{2}) parcel on January 22, 2002, and began negotiations with a developer that June. The developer signed an 85-year lease and paid $1.4 million up front to the MBTA. The Ashmont station renovation was originally to be smaller in scope than the major projects planned at the other Ashmont branch stations. The developer and the local community expressed their desires for a larger renovation, but the MBTA proceeded with design work.

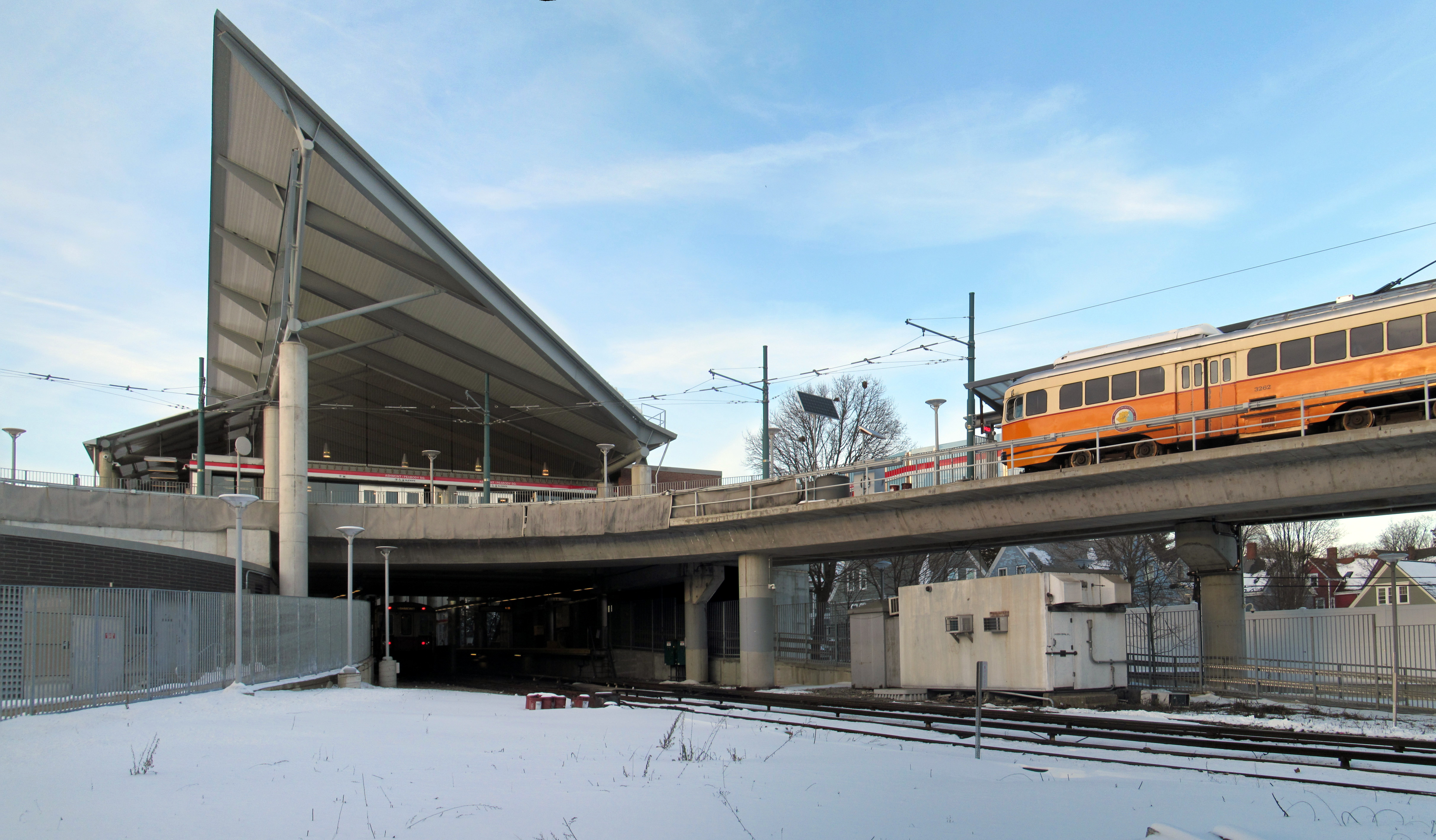
An Ashmont–Mattapan line streetcar on the new loop at Ashmont in 2016

On January 10, 2003, with design work at 90% and $2.2 million spent, the MBTA stopped work. A $3.3 million design for a full reconstruction was authorized on February 12, 2004. The Shawmut and Fields Corner projects were constructed separate from the delayed Ashmont work. The MBTA removed the membrane canopy from the design in September 2004 due to lack of funds. However, it was necessary to re-add (at a cost of $2.9 million) because many of the interior elements were not weatherproofed. Original plans to include public art as part of the Arts on the Line program were removed in budget cuts; only historical interpretive panels were installed.

In September 2004, the MBTA began reconstruction of the 75-year-old station, then expected to cost $44 million. The MBTA awarded the $35.2 million main construction contract on June 9, 2005. The reconstruction included demolition of the existing station, the addition of two fare lobbies over the ends of the station, and a new busway at the fare lobby level. Elevators were added to make the station fully accessible, and direct access from Peabody Square (removed in the 1970s renovation) was added. The Ashmont–Mattapan line loop was moved to a new viaduct at the south end of the station, with a platform near the south fare lobby; the former cross-platform transfer was eliminated. Charliecard electronic fare collection equipment at the station was activated on December 22, 2006.

Red Line service to Ashmont was maintained through the whole construction process. However, the Ashmont–Mattapan line was closed from June 24, 2006, to December 22, 2007, for construction of the new viaduct. During that time, Mattapan station and the intermediate stations were also renovated for accessibility. The main reconstruction contract was completed in 2009 at a cost of $53.2 million - an increase of $18 million over the original price due to change orders. The $10.3 million architectural work lasted until June 14, 2011, at which point the station was declared accessible. In September 2011, a "HOLD" sign was installed on the trolley platform to allow an easier connection for those transferring from the Red Line. The total cost of the entire reconstruction was $83 million. The plaza at the north end of the station was renamed Droser Plaza in November 2019 after Vince Droser, a Dorchester resident and community organizer who died in 2011.

Buses replaced service on the Ashmont Branch and Mattapan Line from October 14–29, 2023, to allow for track work. The MBTA plans to convert the Mattapan Line to modern light rail equipment. All stations would have raised platforms for level boarding on the new vehicles. The 2007-built streetcar loop and platform at Mattapan would be demolished and replaced with a new alignment.
