= Square One Mall =

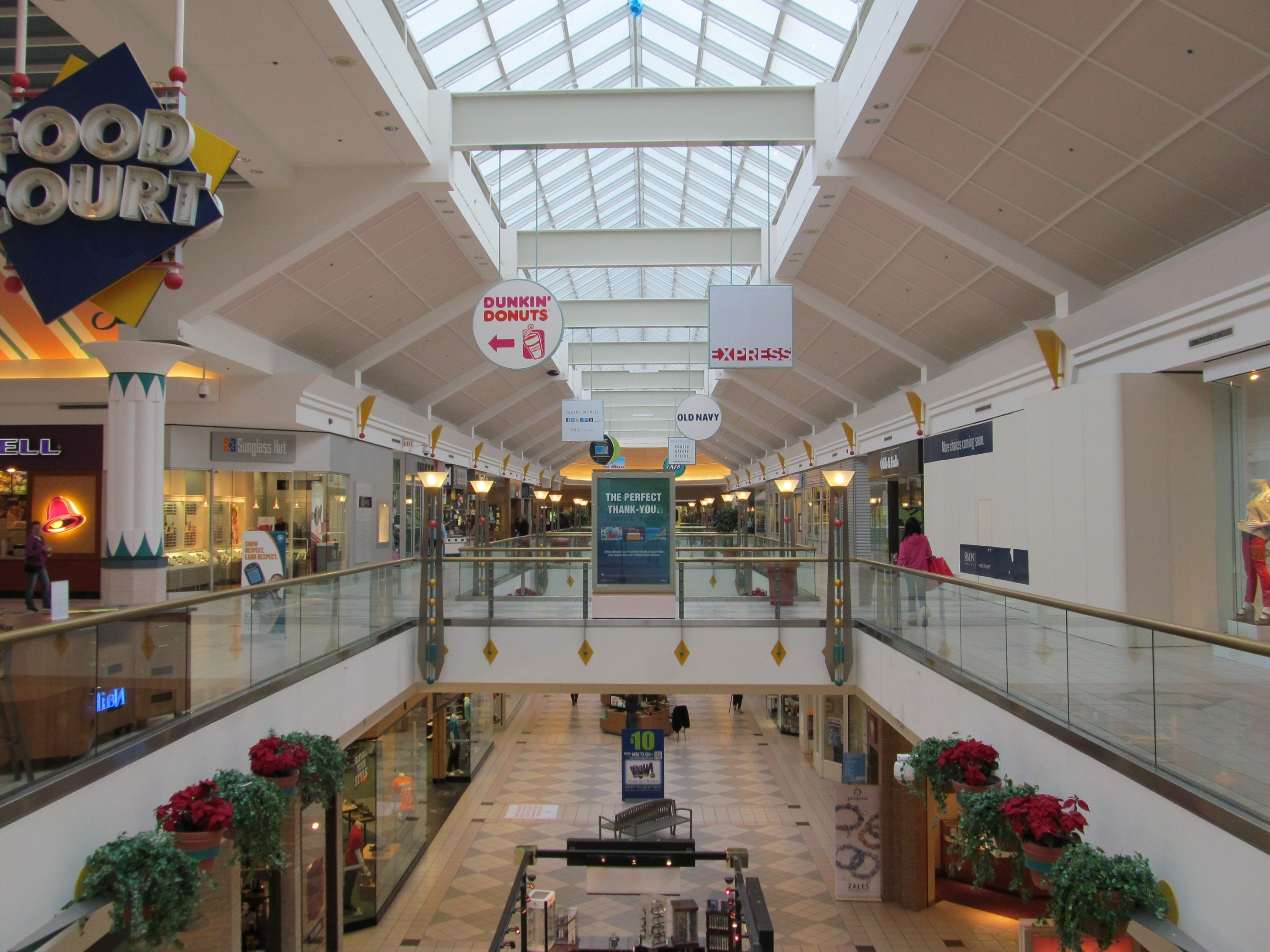
- Inside Square One Mall
- Location: Saugus, Massachusetts
- Coordinates: 42.4608°N 71.0273°W
- Opened: August 17, 1994; 32 years ago
- Developer: New England Development Corp.
- Owner: Simon Property Group (56.4%)
- Num. of stores: 125
- Num. of anchor tenants: 5 (4 open, 1 vacant)
- Floor area: 929,844 square feet (86,385.3 square meters)
- Floors: 2
- Parking: Lighted Lot; Parking Garage
- Website: www.square-one-mall.com

Square One Mall is a shopping mall located along US Route 1 (Broadway) between Main Street and Essex Street in Saugus, Massachusetts. Anchor stores are Macy's, Dick's Sporting Goods, Best Buy and TJ Maxx.

== History ==
=== Pre-construction and development ===
In 1955, Alan and Milton Green purchased the former town farm property with plans to construct a large shopping center. The New England Shopping Center was completed in 1961 and included a W. T. Grant, Touraine's, and the largest Sears in New England.

In the 1980s, the property was acquired by Stephen R. Karp's New England Development Corporation, which planned on redeveloping the property into a shopping mall. The project was stalled by a lack of financing, but construction began in 1993 after financing was secured from several banks. The construction of the mall was unique since it incorporated the previously built structure of Sears, signs of this being the difference in building materials between Sears and the rest of the mall. The mall opened for business on August 17, 1994. Its first anchor stores were Sears, Service Merchandise, Filene's, Filene's Basement, and Lechmere.

=== After opening ===
In 1998, Lechmere was replaced by TJ Maxx.

In 1999, New England Development Co. sold 14 of its malls, including Square One Mall, to Simon Property Group, for $1.725 billion.

In 2002, Best Buy acquired six of Service Merchandise's top-performing locations, including its Square One Mall location, as part of the chain's liquidation.

In 2004, the store gained a new anchor tenant with the construction of a new space for Dick's Sporting Goods.

Filene's Basement, one of the malls anchors, filed for bankruptcy protection on May 4, 2009. It was acquired at auction by Syms Corporation, which reached an agreement with Simon Property Group to keep its Square One Mall, South Shore Plaza, Northshore Mall, and Arsenal Mall locations open until December 2011.

In 2015, Sears Holdings spun off 235 of its properties, including the Sears at Square One Mall, into Seritage Growth Properties. Sears downsized its store to the lower level in 2017, leaving the upper level vacant. On June 30, 2020, it was announced that Sears would be closing as part of a plan to close 28 stores nationwide. The store closed on September 13, 2020.
