= Logan Express =

Airport shuttle service in Greater Boston

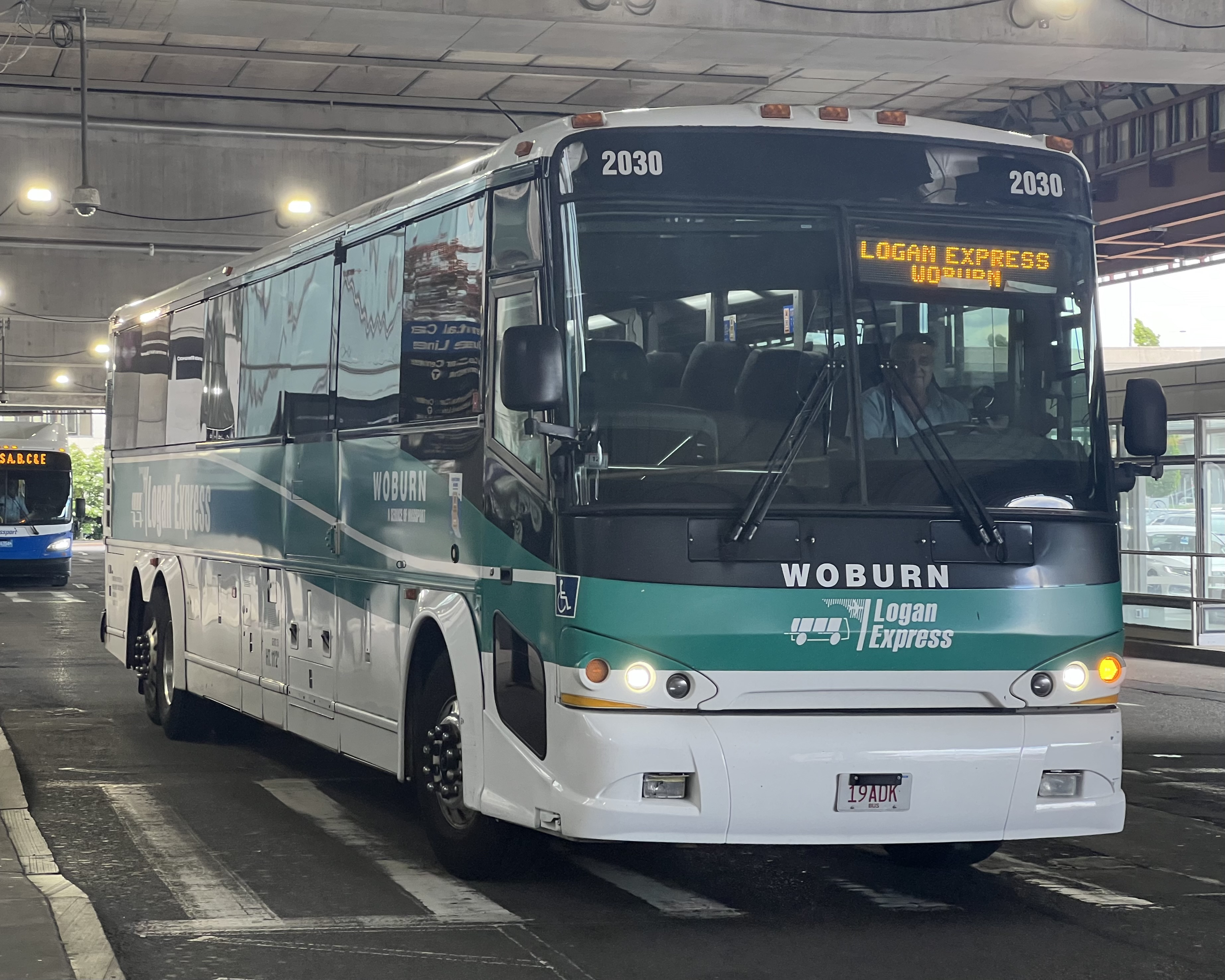
- A Logan Express bus at Terminal E in 2024
- Parent: Massport
- Founded: 1986
- Headquarters: Boston
- Locale: Greater Boston, Massachusetts
- Service type: Airport shuttle
- Routes: 5
- Destinations: Logan International Airport
- Stations: 4 suburban terminals; 2 urban stops; 5 airport stops
- Annual ridership: 2,583,440 (2024)
- Fuel type: Diesel, compressed natural gas
- Operator: Multiple private operators
- Website: https://www.massport.com/logan-airport/getting-to-logan/logan-express
System map
Note: Only pickup locations are shown. Dropoff locations are different at Back Bay station and the airport terminals.
1 Prudential Center (Back Bay)
2 Copley Place (Back Bay)
3 Braintree
4 Danvers
5 Framingham
6 Woburn
7 Terminal A
8 Terminal B (Stop 1)
9 Terminal B (Stop 2)
10 Terminal C
11 Terminal E

Logan Express (LEX) is an airport bus shuttle network in Massachusetts, United States, that serves Logan International Airport from the Greater Boston area. The service is operated by private bus companies under contract to the Massachusetts Port Authority (Massport). The Logan Express network consists of four routes serving suburban park-and-ride terminals in Braintree, Danvers, Framingham, and Woburn, plus an urban route serving the Back Bay neighborhood of Boston. Total ridership was 2,583,440 in 2024, including trips by both air passengers and airport employees.

The service began in September 1986 in response to insufficient parking capacity and traffic congestion at the airport, offering parking rates and fares priced to encourage using the shuttle instead of driving to the airport. The network began with a route from Quincy Adams station and expanded over the following decades. Framingham service was added later in 1986. Quincy Adams was replaced with a Braintree terminal in 1990. Woburn service began in 1992, Peabody service in 2001, and Back Bay service in 2014. Service from South Station was trialed in 1992–93 and 2000–2001. Surface parking lots at the Framingham terminal were replaced in 2015 with a parking garage, which was expanded in 2025. The Peabody terminal was relocated to Danvers in 2024. Massport opened a "remote terminal" – where passengers can clear airport security then take buses directly to the air side of the airport – at Framingham in 2026. Further terminal improvements are planned, including garages at Braintree and additional remote terminals.

== Routes ==
The Logan Express system has five routes: four suburban routes and a route to the Back Bay section of Boston. Each route stops at all terminals. The routes vary in operating hours; most operate from the early morning to late evening with half-hour headways. The Danvers route has hourly headways, as does the Woburn route on weekend mornings. The Framingham site has a "remote terminal" where passengers can clear airport security then take buses directly to the air side of the airport.

Logan Express fares are priced below market rate to encourage use of the service rather than on-airport parking. As of 2026, the suburban services are $9–12 one-way, while the Back Bay route is $3 to Logan and free to Back Bay. Each route is assigned a color for branding purposes. All buses are accessible and have a wheelchair lift. The system carried 2.58 million passengers – 1.66 million air passengers and 0.92 million employees – in 2024. Logan Express was used by 7.4% of Logan air passengers in a 2024 survey.

Route	Terminal(s)	Operator	Color	2024 ridership
Back Bay	Prudential Center, Copley Place	Academy Bus	Orange	233,750
Braintree	Lot near Braintree Split	Paul Revere Bus	Blue	561,947
Danvers	Liberty Tree Mall	McGinn Bus Company	Purple	148,051
Framingham	Garage near Shopper's World	Yankee Line	Red	685,920
Woburn	Anderson Regional Transportation Center	Paul Revere Bus	Green	500,077

== History ==
=== Initial services ===
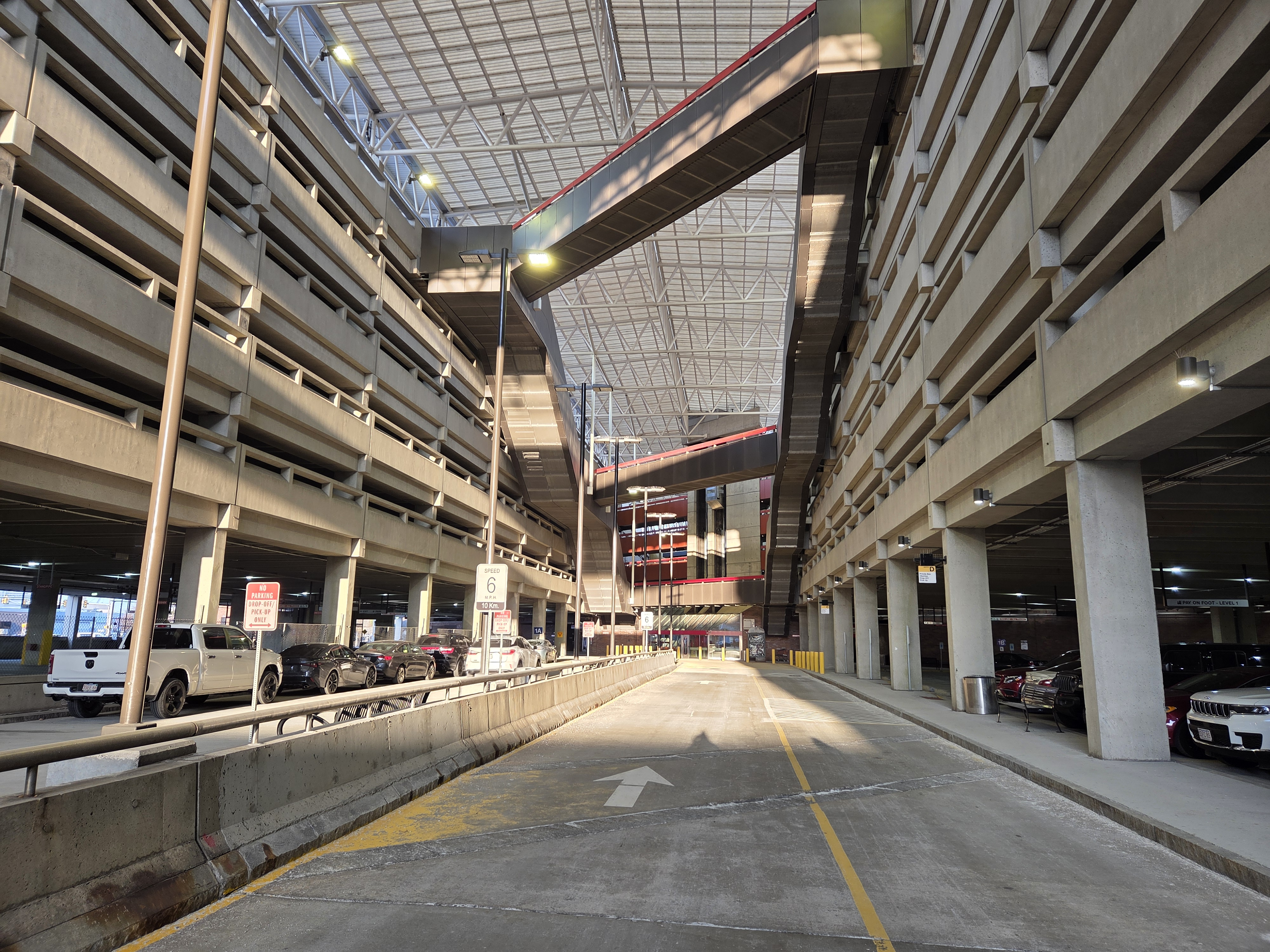
The parking garage at Quincy Adams station was the system's first terminal.

By the early 1980s, Logan Airport had insufficient parking capacity and suffered traffic jams at the terminals. Beginning November 17, 1985, the Massachusetts Bay Transportation Authority (MBTA) ran temporary free service from Quincy Adams station and Alewife station to the airport during the busy travel period leading up to Thanksgiving. Originally planned to end on November 23, it was extended to December 1.

In June 1986, Massport announced plans to increase parking rates and expand public transit to reduce congestion at the airport. It was to include express bus service from Quincy and Framingham. Parking rates at the suburban lots would be set lower than on-airport parking to encourage use of the new services. Half of the cost of the lots was paid by airlines. Massport began full-time service on the Quincy Adams route, with fare required, on September 29, 1986. Operations were contracted to Plymouth & Brockton. From 1988 to 1990, the service was extended past Quincy Adams to Plymouth via MBTA subsidy. The route from the Shopper's World mall in Framingham began on November 16, 1986. It was run by Quickway Transport until December 19, 1986, when Peter Pan Bus Lines took over the contract.

By 1990, the Quincy Adams route only had half the ridership of the Framingham route despite similar market sizes. A Massport study found that the Quincy Adams parking garage filled with MBTA commuters too early in the morning to serve later air passengers, that it lacked a climate-controlled waiting area, and that it did not have Logan Express branding. In July 1990, Massport relocated the terminal to a former drive-in theater site in Braintree near the South Shore Plaza and the Braintree Split (where I-93 meets Route 3). The former concession building was renovated to serve as a terminal with a waiting area and airline ticket counters. Within a year, ridership on the Braintree route had increased by 40%. Paul Revere Transportation took over operation of the Braintree service in 1998.

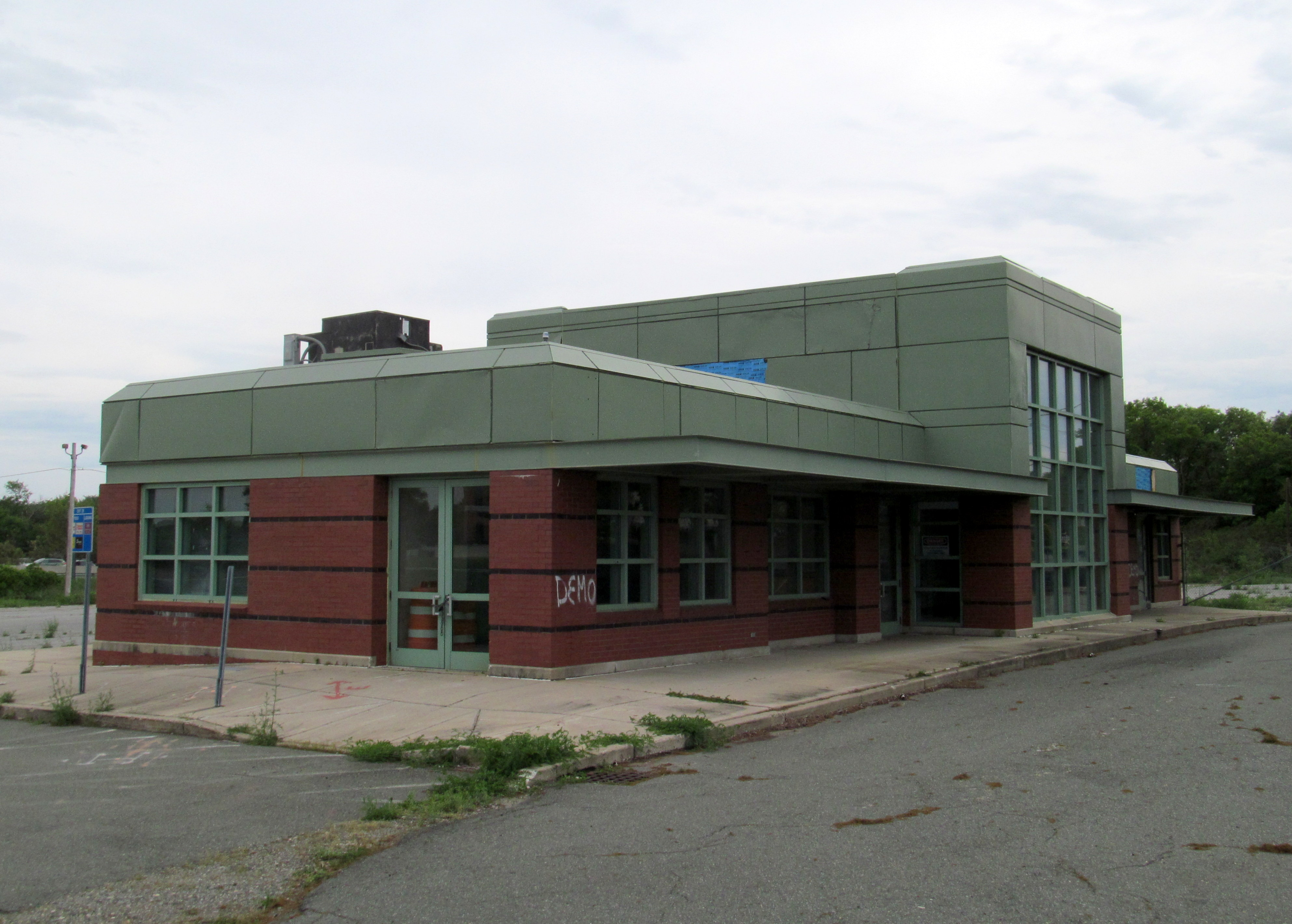
The former Woburn terminal at Mishawum, used from 1993 to 2001

Fox Bus Lines took over the Framingham service in 1993. The initial terminal in the mall's parking lot had limited parking spots and a ten-year lease. In 1990, Massport proposed to move the terminal to a former Trailways bus station off Speen Street in Natick to the east. In 1994, with demolition and replacement of the mall about to begin, Massport proposed a site off Route 30 at Burr Street. Objections from the town, which planned to develop the site as a park, led Massport to consider other locations. The terminal temporarily moved to the south side of the mall on October 1, 1994, due to construction. On July 1, 1995, it moved again to a different site on Burr Street. That became the permanent site; a terminal building opened in February 1997.

A route from Mishawum station in Woburn was added on November 16, 1992. An expanded parking lot and terminal building were added in 1993. Originally operated by Peter Pan, the route was taken over by Paul Revere Transportation in November 1995. The Woburn terminal was moved to the new Anderson Regional Transportation Center on April 8, 2001. A route from Peabody, with a terminal on Route 1 near I-95, was added on September 7, 2001. McGinn Bus Company was the operator for the service. It was slow to gain ridership due to the post-September 11 drop in air travel and frequency was halved on November 3, 2001.

=== Expansions ===
Massport made several attempts to develop bus service between Logan Airport and Downtown Boston. Logan Link van service between South Station and the airport, operated by Paul Revere, began on May 4, 1992. It operated only during weekday peak hours, with schedules timed to connect to MBTA Commuter Rail service. Logan Link was discontinued effective July 1, 1993, due to low ridership. Logan Dart service between the South Station Bus Terminal and the airport began on November 14, 2000. It operated Sunday through Friday from 6 am to 8 pm. Originally operated by A&B Coach, it was taken over by Paul Revere in June 2001 and discontinued that November. The MBTA began daily Silver Line bus service between South Station and the airport in June 2005.

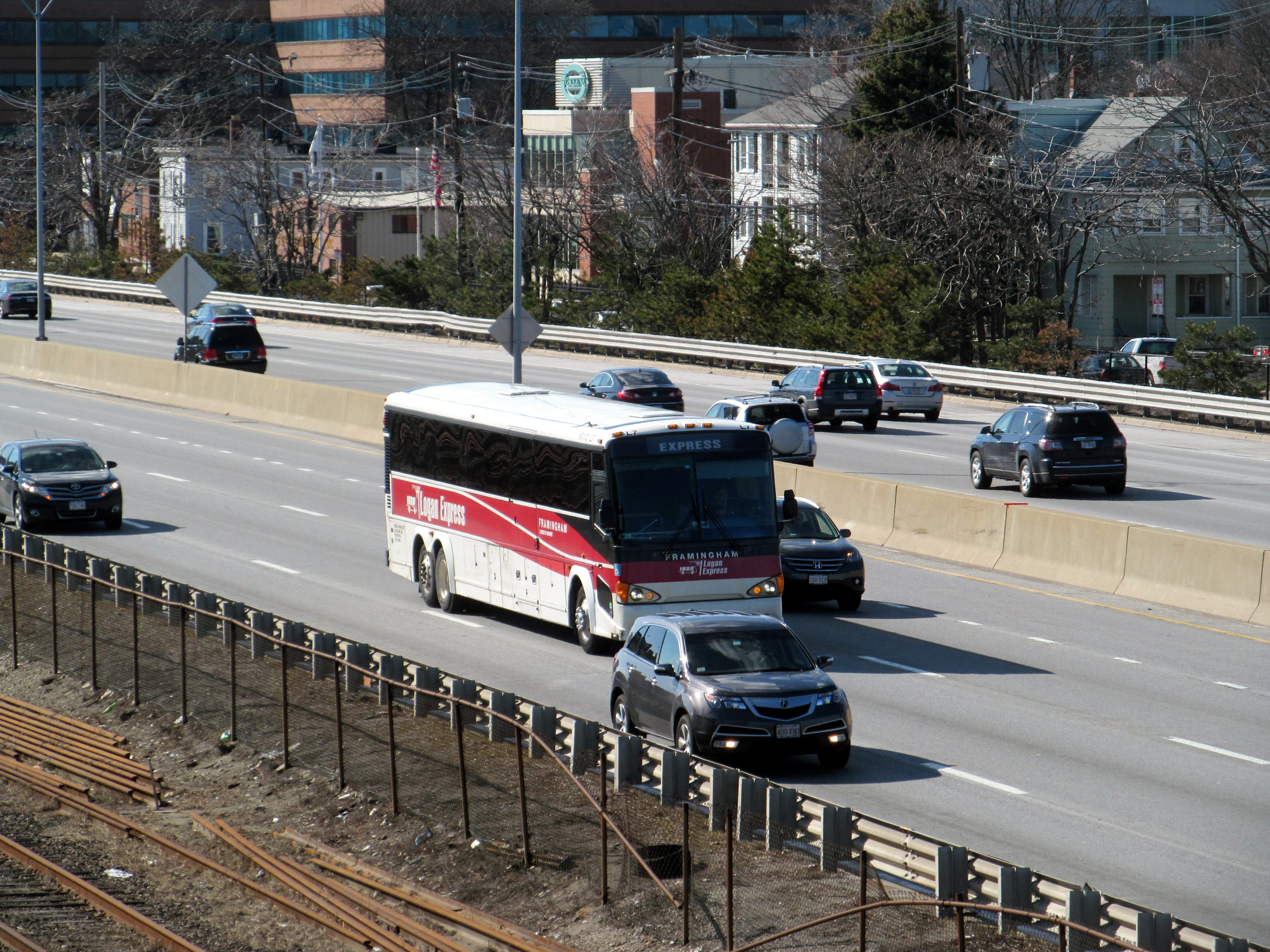
Framingham Logan Express bus in 2017

By 2001, the 350-space lot at Framingham was insufficient; Massport leased additional overflow parking spots in nearby commercial lots to meet demand. In early 2001, Massport received approval to build a four-level, 1,081-space parking garage. However, the plan was shelved after the September 11 attacks. The plans were revived in the early 2010s as ridership increased. Service temporarily moved to a lot on the Mathworks campus in Natick on June 23, 2014, to allow construction. The garage opened on April 16, 2015. The Framingham route was the most-used Logan Express route by 2018, with 740,000 annual riders.

Massport purchased the Braintree terminal site for $47.1 million in 2014. The Braintree route was the second-most-used Logan Express route by 2018, with 580,000 annual riders. Frequency was increased to every 20 minutes in May 2019.

On April 28, 2014, the Back Bay route began service as a two-year pilot program during the Government Center station closure. The route operated on 20-minute headways with stops on Boylston Street at Hynes Convention Center and Copley station. By 2019, Massport planned to add a route to North Station and an additional suburban route. On May 1, 2019, the Copley stop was replaced with a stop at Back Bay station on Dartmouth Street. The airport-bound fare was reduced from $7.50 to $3.00 and the Back Bay-bound fare made free; passengers were also given priority at security lines in the airport. By October, these changes had doubled ridership on the Back Bay route. Both Back Bay stops were relocated on February 1, 2020: the Hynes Convention Center stop a block east to the Prudential Center entrance, and the Back Bay station stop across Dartmouth Street to the Copley Place entrance.

=== COVID-19 changes ===
Peabody service was suspended on March 18, 2020 due to the COVID-19 pandemic; Braintree and Back Bay service was reduced to 30-minute headways. Back Bay service was suspended on March 27, with the remaining three routes reduced to hourly service. Woburn service was suspended on January 1, 2021. It resumed on June 1, 2021, along with additional early-morning service from Braintree and Framingham. Woburn, Framingham, and Braintree service all resumed half-hour frequency by mid-2022. Back Bay service was planned to resume in July 2021; due to a shortage of bus drivers, it did not resume until October 3, 2022, with Academy Bus as the new operator. Peabody service resumed on February 13, 2022, with a new terminal at the Northshore Mall in Peabody. The terminal moved from Peabody to Liberty Tree Mall in Danvers on August 6, 2024.

=== Further expansion ===
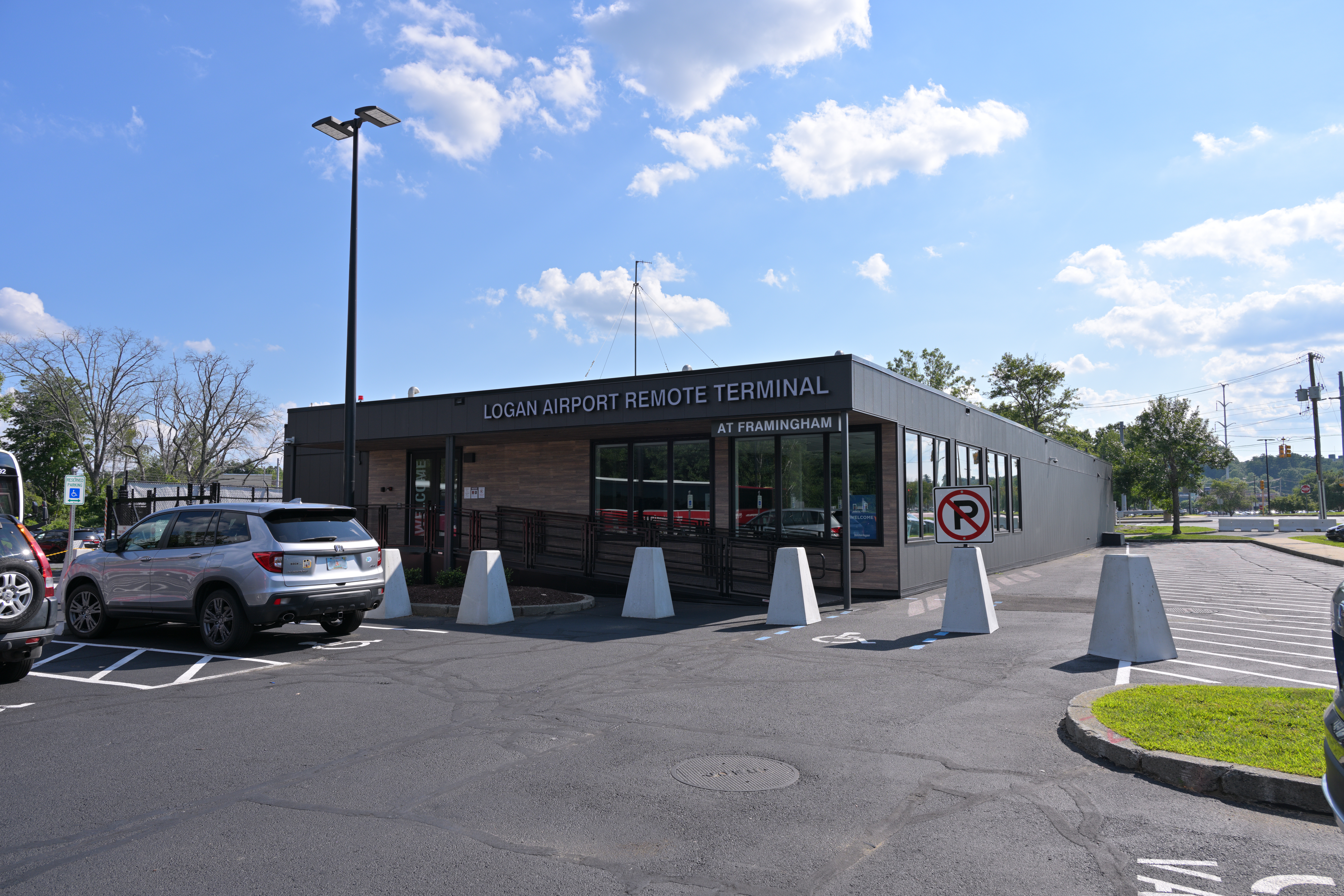
The Framingham remote terminal in 2026

Total ridership reached a record 2.58 million passengers in 2024, including 0.92 million employee trips on the suburban routes. Framingham service temporarily moved to the Natick Mall on January 6, 2025, for construction of three additional floors in the garage. The expanded garage was intended to allow frequency to be increased to every 20 minutes. It opened in November 2025. In September 2025, Massport announced plans to add a "remote terminal" at Framingham where passengers could go through airport security and check bags before boarding buses directly to the air side of the airport. It opened on June 1, 2026 for Delta Air Lines and JetBlue customers. Massport indicated that if the pilot program was successful, it might be extended to other Logan Express locations. The program was originally a three-month pilot; in late July, it was extended to March 2027. Yankee Line took over operation of the Framingham service in early 2026.

The existing surface lots and passenger building at Braintree are to be replaced with two eight-story garages with a total of 5,500 spaces, plus a new passenger building with a remote terminal, at a cost of $500 million. As an interim capacity measure, employee parking was moved from Braintree to a separate lot in Quincy in 2023. By 2025, the first garage and the passenger building were planned to be built from August 2026 to February 2028, with the second garage built from February 2028 to August 2030. Groundbreaking took place in October 2026.

As of 2025, parking lot reconfiguration and a permanent building in Danvers are expected to be completed later in the 2020s at an estimated cost of $17 million.
