= South Quincy =

Coordinates: 42.239°N 71.008°W

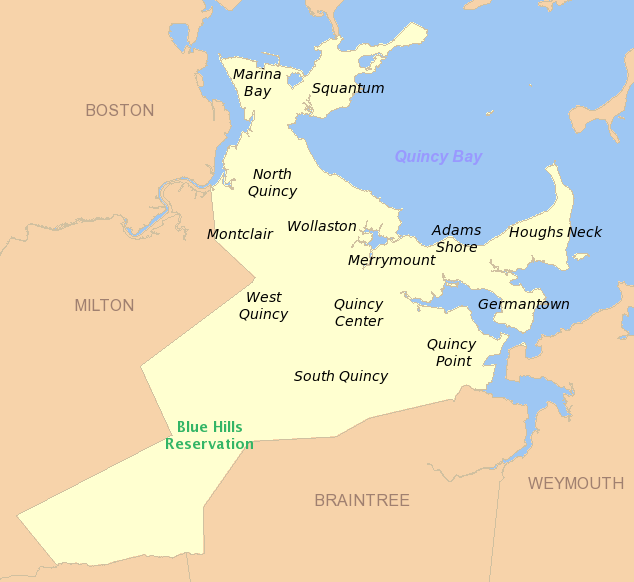
Map of Quincy neighborhoods

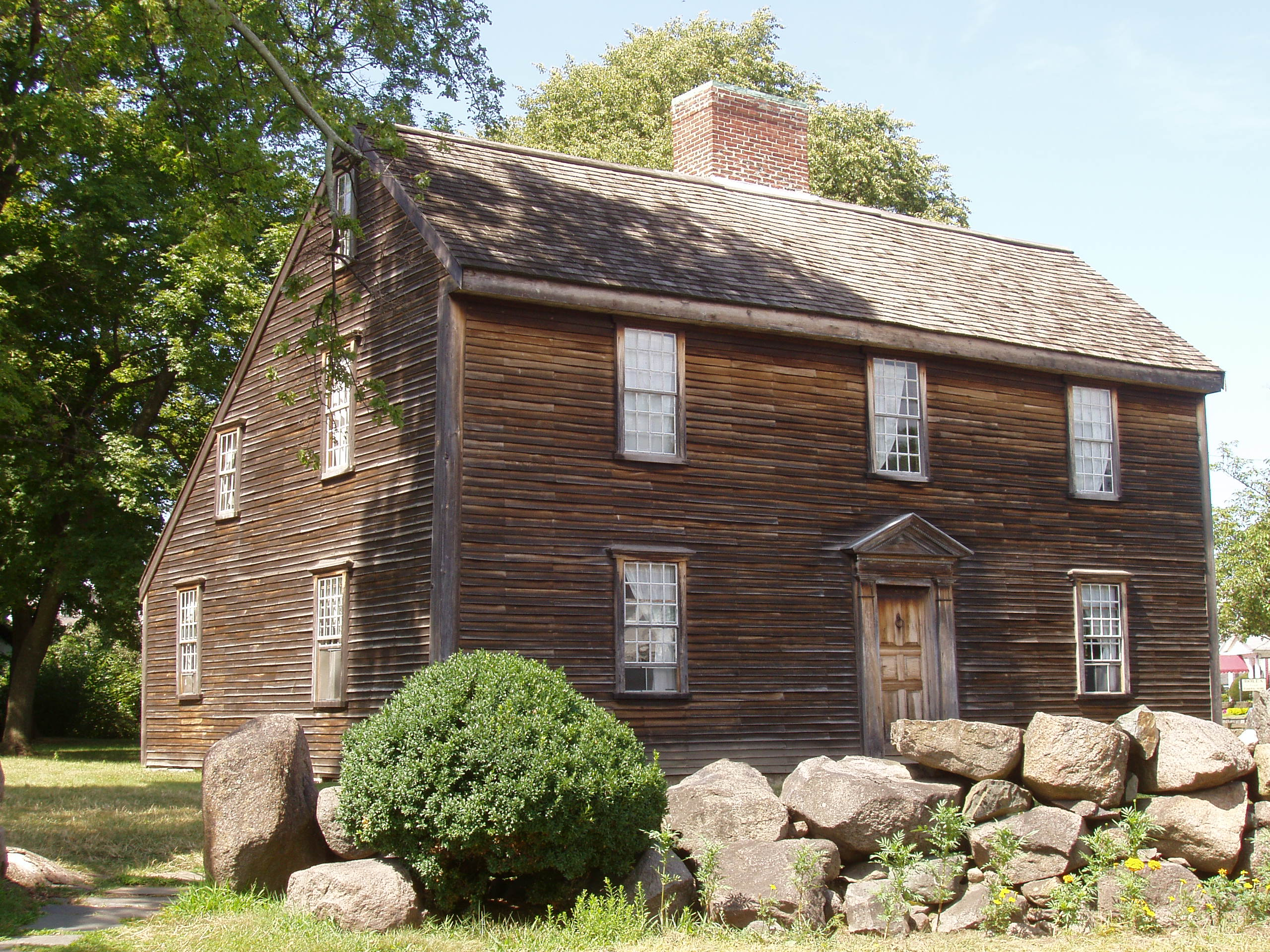
John Adams birthplace

South Quincy is a neighborhood of Quincy, Massachusetts. Located in the south central portion of the city, South Quincy is bordered on the north by Quincy Center and West Quincy, on the east by Quincy Avenue and the Quincy Point neighborhood, on the south by Braintree and on the west by Interstate 93.

== History ==
South Quincy became populated in part as a result of the growth of the granite industry in Quincy in the 1800s. Part of the neighborhood was once farms owned by Charles Francis Adams, Sr. and Job Faxon that were subdivided into lots. The Faxon family donated land to the city in 1885 that became the wooded Faxon Park. In 1987, the neighborhood became home to the Crown Colony Office Park, located at the Braintree Split intersection of Interstate 93 and Massachusetts Route 3 on the site of the former Old Colony Crushed Stone Company.

== Transportation ==
Burgin Parkway, Centre Street, Independence Avenue and Water Street are major thoroughfares in the neighborhood. South Quincy is served by bus routes 230, 236, and 238 of the Massachusetts Bay Transportation Authority. South Quincy is also the location of the Quincy Adams subway station and parking facility, a major transportation hub for South Shore Massachusetts commuters. The Southeast Expressway is located adjacent to the neighborhood on the west.
