= List of 2009 box office number-one films in Canada =

This is a list of films which have placed number one at the weekend box office in Canada during 2009.

== Weekend gross list ==
†	This implies the highest-grossing movie of the year.

#	Weekend End Date	Film	Weekend Gross (millions)	Notes
1	January 4, 2009	Marley & Me	$1.80	
2	January 11, 2009	Bride Wars	$1.65	Gran Torino was #1 in North America.
3	January 18, 2009	Paul Blart: Mall Cop	$2.65	
4	January 25, 2009	Paul Blart: Mall Cop	$1.91	
5	February 1, 2009	Taken	$1.54	
6	February 8, 2009	He's Just Not That Into You	$2.33	
7	February 15, 2009	Friday the 13th	$2.43	
8	February 22, 2009	Slumdog Millionaire	$1.10	Slumdog Millionaire reached #1 in its fifteenth weekend of release. Slumdog Millionaire won the 81st Academy Award for Best Motion Picture of the Year. Madea Goes to Jail was #1 in North America.
9	March 1, 2009	Slumdog Millionaire	$1.50	Madea Goes to Jail was #1 in North America.
10	March 8, 2009	Watchmen	$3.95	
11	March 15, 2009	Watchmen	$2.00	Race to Witch Mountain was #1 in North America.
12	March 22, 2009	Knowing	$2.03	
13	March 29, 2009	Monsters vs. Aliens	$4.21	
14	April 5, 2009	Fast & Furious	$5.48	
15	April 12, 2009	Hannah Montana: The Movie	$3.04	
16	April 19, 2009	17 Again	$2.67	
17	April 26, 2009	17 Again	$1.71	Obsessed was #1 in North America.
18	May 3, 2009	X-Men Origins: Wolverine	$6.41	
19	May 10, 2009	Star Trek	$5.44	
20	May 17, 2009	Angels & Demons	$5.07	
21	May 24, 2009	Terminator Salvation	$3.48	Night at the Museum: Battle of the Smithsonian was #1 in North America.
22	May 31, 2009	Up	$4.95	
23	June 7, 2009	Up	$3.64	The Hangover was #1 in North America.
24	June 14, 2009	The Hangover	$2.68	The Hangover reached #1 in Canada in the second weekend.
25	June 21, 2009	The Proposal	$2.67	
26	June 28, 2009	Transformers: Revenge of the Fallen	$8.00	
27	July 5, 2009	Transformers: Revenge of the Fallen	$3.67	
28	July 12, 2009	Brüno	$2.89	
29	July 19, 2009	Harry Potter and the Half-Blood Prince	$6.95	
30	July 26, 2009	Harry Potter and the Half-Blood Prince	$3.22	G-Force was #1 in North America.
31	August 2, 2009	Funny People	$1.78	
32	August 9, 2009	G.I. Joe: The Rise of Cobra	$3.39	
33	August 16, 2009	District 9	$3.58	
34	August 23, 2009	Inglourious Basterds	$3.55	
35	August 30, 2009	The Final Destination	$2.39	
36	September 6, 2009	Inglourious Basterds	$1.04	The Final Destination was #1 in North America.
37	September 13, 2009	9	$0.90	I Can Do Bad All By Myself was # 1 in North America.
38	September 20, 2009	Cloudy with a Chance of Meatballs	$2.86	
39	September 27, 2009	Cloudy with a Chance of Meatballs	$2.50	
40	October 4, 2009	Zombieland	$2.44	
41	October 11, 2009	Couples Retreat	$2.72	
42	October 18, 2009	Law Abiding Citizen	$2.02	Where the Wild Things Are was # 1 in North America.
43	October 25, 2009	Law Abiding Citizen	$1.58	Paranormal Activity was #1 in North America.
44	November 1, 2009	Michael Jackson's This Is It	$1.95	
45	November 8, 2009	A Christmas Carol	$2.42	
46	November 15, 2009	2012	$5.55	
47	November 22, 2009	The Twilight Saga: New Moon	$10.12	The Twilight Saga: New Moon had the highest opening weekend in Canada in 2009.
48	November 29, 2009	The Twilight Saga: New Moon	$3.87	
49	December 6, 2009	The Twilight Saga: New Moon	$1.82	The Blind Side was #1 in North America.
50	December 13, 2009	The Princess and the Frog	$1.16	
51	December 20, 2009	Avatar †	$6.26	
52	December 27, 2009	Avatar †	$6.05	

== Highest-grossing films in Canada ==
Rank	Title	Studio	Total Gross (in millions)	Notes
1	Avatar	Fox	$94.55	
2	Transformers: Revenge of the Fallen	Paramount	$33.79	
3	Harry Potter and the Half-Blood Prince	Warner Bros.	$30.63	
4	The Twilight Saga: New Moon	Summit	$26.28	
5	The Hangover	Warner Bros.	$25.33	
6	Star Trek	Paramount	$24.67	
7	Up	Disney/Pixar	$24.59	
8	Sherlock Holmes	Warner Bros.	$21.34	
9	Ice Age: Dawn of the Dinosaurs	Fox	$19.62	
10	Monsters vs. Aliens	Paramount/DreamWorks	$18.32	
11	Alvin and the Chipmunks: The Squeakquel	Fox	$17.00	
12	X-Men Origins: Wolverine	Fox	$16.96	
13	Angels & Demons	Fox	$16.35	
14	2012	Columbia	$16.27	
15	District 9	Columbia	$15.37	
16	The Proposal	Disney	$15.22	
17	Inglourious Basterds	Weinstin	$15.11	
18	Fast & Furious	Universal	$14.16	
19	A Christmas Carol	Disney	$13.33	
20	Cloudy with a Chance of Meatballs	Columbia	$13.16	
21	Paul Blart: Mall Cop	Columbia	$13.16	
22	Terminator Salvation	Warner Bros.	$11.76	
23	G.I. Joe: The Rise of Cobra	Paramount	$11.73	
24	Watchmen	Warner Bros.	$11.52	
25	The Blind Side	Warner Bros.	$11.43	

== See also ==
- List of Canadian films
