= Westgate Mall (Massachusetts) =

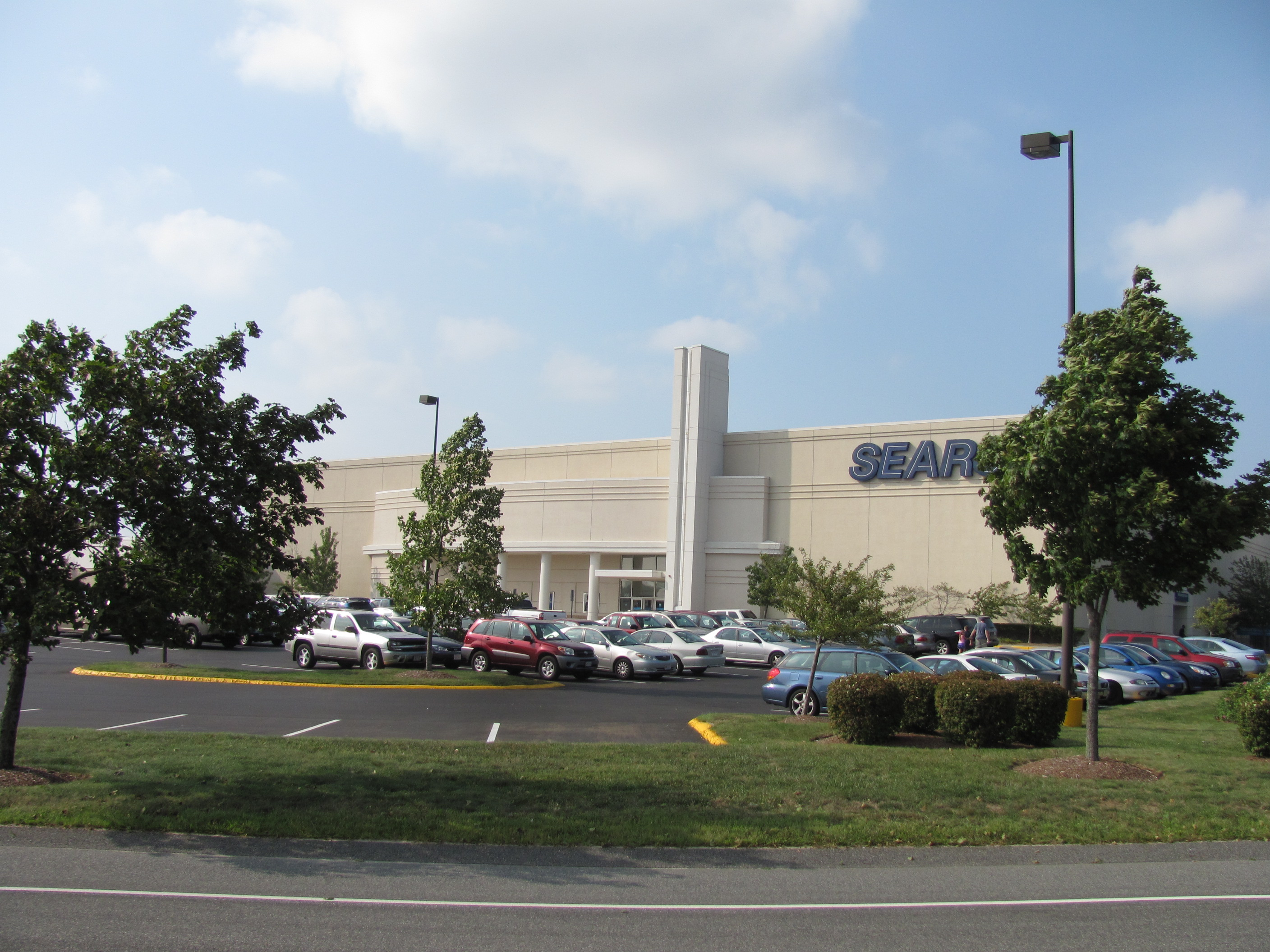
- Sears (now closed)
- Location: Brockton, Massachusetts, United States
- Coordinates: 42.0955°N 71.0519°W
- Address: 200 Westgate Drive
- Opened: February 24, 1963
- Developer: Raymond Mucci, Joseph Campanelli
- Manager: New England Development Corp.
- Owner: New England Development Corp.
- Num. of stores: 65+
- Num. of anchor tenants: 11 (10 open, 1 vacant)
- Floor area: 600,000 sq ft (56,000 m^{2})
- Floors: 1 (2 in former Sears)
- Website: www.shopatwestgatemall.com

Westgate Mall is a shopping mall in the city of Brockton, Massachusetts. It is the oldest enclosed shopping mall in the state. Westgate Mall features Best Buy Outlet, Burlington, Dick's Sporting Goods, Liam's Home Furniture, Old Navy, and Planet Fitness. Although Westgate Mall's GLA is small by regional standards, it is also surrounded by numerous adjacent big-box stores including: Walmart, Lowe's, Aldi, Market Basket, Marshalls, and Ocean State Job Lot. These standalone retailers complement the main building, driving increased traffic to the location as a shopping destination.

== History ==
Today's 600,000-square-foot (56,000 m^{2}) mall opened as the 356,000-square-foot (33,100 m^{2}) Westgate Shopper's Park in February 1963. The original anchor store was local department store Gilchrist's, which was expanded in 1984-85 and substantially renovated between 2000 and 2003. The Gilchrist's store was then replaced by Jordan Marsh in 1977 (became the first Macy's in 1996) while Sears was later added to the mall in 1999. Toys R Us was added next to Macy’s in the 80s but moved to a new location in 1991. The new location is down a street close to the original. The mall's former Bradlees store was then replaced with a new Filene's store in 2002 (became second Macy's in 2006).

Ownership of the mall has changed hands several times over the past decade. The original developer and owner of the mall was Raymond Mucci. The mall was purchased by New England Development for $17 million in 1999, with plans to revitalize the vintage mall. Over several years, the new owners spent significant resources to remodel it, and were very successful in turning the mall around. In 2004, New England Development sold Westgate to Gregory Greenfield & Assoc. (GG&A) for $58.5 million; three years later, GG&A was taken over by Australia-based Babcock & Brown. In 2009, Bank of America foreclosed the mall due to "breach of conditions" on its mortgage with Babcock & Brown, and the property was auctioned. In 2010, New England Development again purchased the property for $31.75 million, and as of 2016 remains Westgate Mall's current owner.

On January 4, 2017, it was announced that Macy's would be closing as part of a plan to close 68 stores nationwide. The store closed in March 2017. On June 29, 2018, Toys "R" Us closed after the chain's liquidation. On August 6, 2018, it was announced Fallas would also be closing as part of a plan to close 74 stores nationwide after parent company National Stores filed for Chapter 11 bankruptcy. The former Macy's was partially replaced by Burlington and Planet Fitness in September 2018 and October 2018 respectively with PCX Apparel taking another portion of that space. On January 8, 2019, Ocean State Job Lot announced that it would be opening in the former Toys "R" Us sometime in 2019. In late 2019, Chick-fil-A opened up at the mall in the plaza surrounding it. On January 5, 2020, Liam's Home Furniture opened in the former Fallas space. On August 8, 2020, Dick's Sporting Goods opened in the remaining portion of the former Macy's space relocating from a freestanding store.

On January 14, 2021, it was announced that Best Buy would be closing as part of a plan to close 5 stores nationwide. The store closed on February 27, 2021. On April 1, 2021, it was announced that Best Buy would reopen as Best Buy Outlet in May 2021.

On February 12, 2021, it was announced that Sears would also be closing as part of a plan to close 32 stores nationwide. The store closed on May 2, 2021.
