= Braintree Split =

Highway interchange in Massachusetts, United States

- Aerial image of the Braintree Split in 2019
- Interactive map of Braintree Split

Location
- Braintree–Quincy, Massachusetts
- Coordinates: 42.227°N 71.021°W
- Roads at junction: I-93; US 1; Route 3

Construction
- Type: Full Y
- Maintained by: Massachusetts Department of Transportation

The Braintree Split is the major interchange of Interstate 93 (I-93), U.S. Route 1 (US 1), and Route 3 in Braintree, Massachusetts, one of the South Shore suburbs of Boston. Traveling northbound, the routes merge into a three-way concurrency towards Boston. Traveling southbound, they divide into the concurrent I-93 and US 1 towards southeastern Massachusetts, and Route 3 towards Cape Cod.

The split is located close to the border between Braintree and Quincy. It was previously the southern terminus of Route 128, the main beltway around Boston; it shared the roadbed with I-93 and US 1 traveling towards the split before they join with Route 3. It was truncated to the junction of I-93 and I-95 in Canton in 1997; despite no longer carrying this designation, the split continues to be informally recognized as the starting point of Route 128 within Massachusetts.

The Braintree Split is used as a focal point in local radio and television traffic reports. In 2006, weekday traffic volume through the interchange averaged 250,000 to 275,000 vehicles daily.

== Description ==
The Braintree Split, technically a "Directional T" type of interchange, is the main road gateway to the South Shore region of Massachusetts, making it a critical point in Boston's highway system. The Southeast Expressway is the single limited access highway traveling south out of Boston, carrying traffic from the city destined for communities in populous Norfolk (659,909 residents) and Plymouth (492,066 residents) counties, partly due to the 1973 cancellation of the planned Southwest Corridor alignment of Interstate 95 into Boston. Drivers other than those headed for parts of Milton and Quincy which straddle the Expressway traverse the split to connect with Route 3 and Route 24 traveling to the more southern localities. Similarly, Boston traffic bound for cities and towns in southeastern Massachusetts including western Norfolk and Bristol County (545,823 residents) and in Rhode Island negotiate the Braintree Split prior to continuing along Route 24 or Interstate 95. Finally, Route 3 serves as the primary freeway route to Cape Cod from Boston's Inner Core. Travelers headed north from these destinations into Boston via I-93 north, or the inland southern and western suburbs via I-93 south, likewise encounter the interchange in Braintree.

== Congestion issues ==
Factors local to the Braintree Split contribute to chronic congestion at the interchange. The split is bordered on the south by South Shore Plaza, a major regional shopping mall. It is adjacent to the I-93 intersection with Route 37/Granite Street in Braintree which feeds retail, lodging, manufacturing and office complexes along Wood Road and Forbes Road, which run parallel to the north and south lanes of I-93 west of the split. The Crown Colony office complex in South Quincy and office buildings on Willard Street, the northern continuation of Route 37/Granite Street into West Quincy, are also accessed from the south via ramps at or next to the split. Short weaves, lane drops and line-of-sight problems all contribute to congestion in the interchange and the highways it serves. In addition to these issues, the split also serves the Quincy Adams subway station and Burgin Parkway, a major route into downtown Quincy, through ramps exiting the directional ramps for each roadway.
