= Burlington Mall (Massachusetts) =

Shopping mall in Massachusetts

- Coordinates: 42.48212°N 71.21398°W
- Address: 75 Middlesex Turnpike, Burlington, Massachusetts, United States
- Opened: 1968
- Developer: Melvin Simon & Associates
- Manager: Simon Property Group
- Num. of stores: 209
- Num. of anchor tenants: 4 (3 open, 1 closed)
- Floor area: 1,264,825 square feet (117,506.1 m^{2})
- Floors: 2 (3 in Macy's)
- Website: www.simon.com/mall/burlington-mall

Burlington Mall is a shopping mall located in Burlington, Massachusetts. It was opened in 1968. Anchor stores are Nordstrom, Macy's, and Primark, with one vacant anchor building formerly housing Lord & Taylor.

== History ==
=== Opening ===
Burlington Mall was developed by Herbert H. Johnson Associates (architects) and Symmes, Maini, and McKee Inc. (associate architects and engineers). New York–based Bellwether Properties purchased the property in 1920 for more than $2,000. Part of the land the mall is on was owned by a local produce merchant and farmer, Vesili Matto. The Albanian immigrant leased his land to the developers for $10,000 a year until 2065, when the 100-year lease is up. It will then be sold from the remaining Matto family to the mall for the value of the land which experts say will be around $75 million. The mall opened with the anchor stores Sears, Jordan Marsh, and Filene's. In its early years, the mall also featured a small Stop & Shop supermarket, a two-screen cinema, and an indoor open-air food court. A new addition housing Lord & Taylor was built on the east side of the mall in 1978.

=== Development and store changes ===
A second story was added to the entire mall in 1988, although many anchor stores already had multiple levels. Before the renovations and expansions on the Natick Mall were finished in 2007, the Burlington Mall was the largest mall in Massachusetts. It remains the 2nd largest mall in the state.

From 2006 to 2008, the mall underwent an expansion project that added a new wing (with approximately 20 new stores) on the site of the demolished Filene's building with a new Nordstrom department store anchoring the wing. The new wing was partially opened in November 2007. Tenants in the new wing include upscale stores such as Michael Kors, Anthropologie, Lululemon Athletica, Urban Outfitters and Free People as its tenants. A similar expansion, also including a Nordstrom department store, at the nearby Northshore Mall commenced construction shortly after.

Burlington Mall's property transformation began in January 2018 and continued until late 2022. There were three phases to the project with their own scope of work as outlined below:

- Phase I – The Village At Burlington Mall (former Sears Auto) has over a dozen beauty, wellness, tech shops and fast-casual to sit down restaurants. The Village has pedestrian walkways just steps away from the Phase II expansion.
- Phase II – Redevelopment of the lower-level Sears building (Primark remained in place on the upper level) was transformed into small shops and restaurant spaces with interior mall corridors and 3 exterior entrances. Several brands are orientated around the outdoor seating and amenities, including the one acre Park.
- Phase III – Redesign and enhancements to the Exterior Entrance and landscaping while including patio dining at the center and a mall renovation.

Burlington Mall is also notable for several unique dining venues and it was home to the Bazille in Nordstrom, and one of only a few Chick-fil-A locations in the state of Massachusetts until 2014. The mall was used in the 2009 film Paul Blart: Mall Cop during the chase scene.

== In popular culture ==
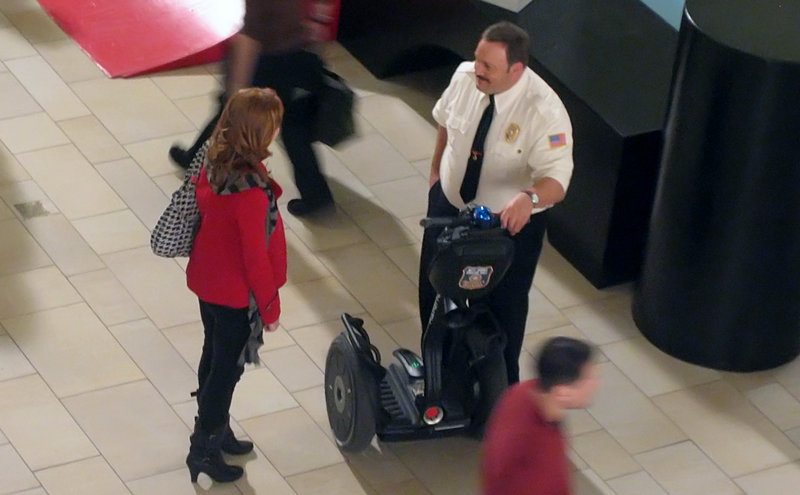
Kevin James filming Paul Blart: Mall Cop at Burlington Mall

The 2009 film Paul Blart: Mall Cop was filmed at the mall, representing the fictional West Orange Pavilion Mall.
