= Northshore Mall =

Shopping mall in Essex County, Massachusetts, US

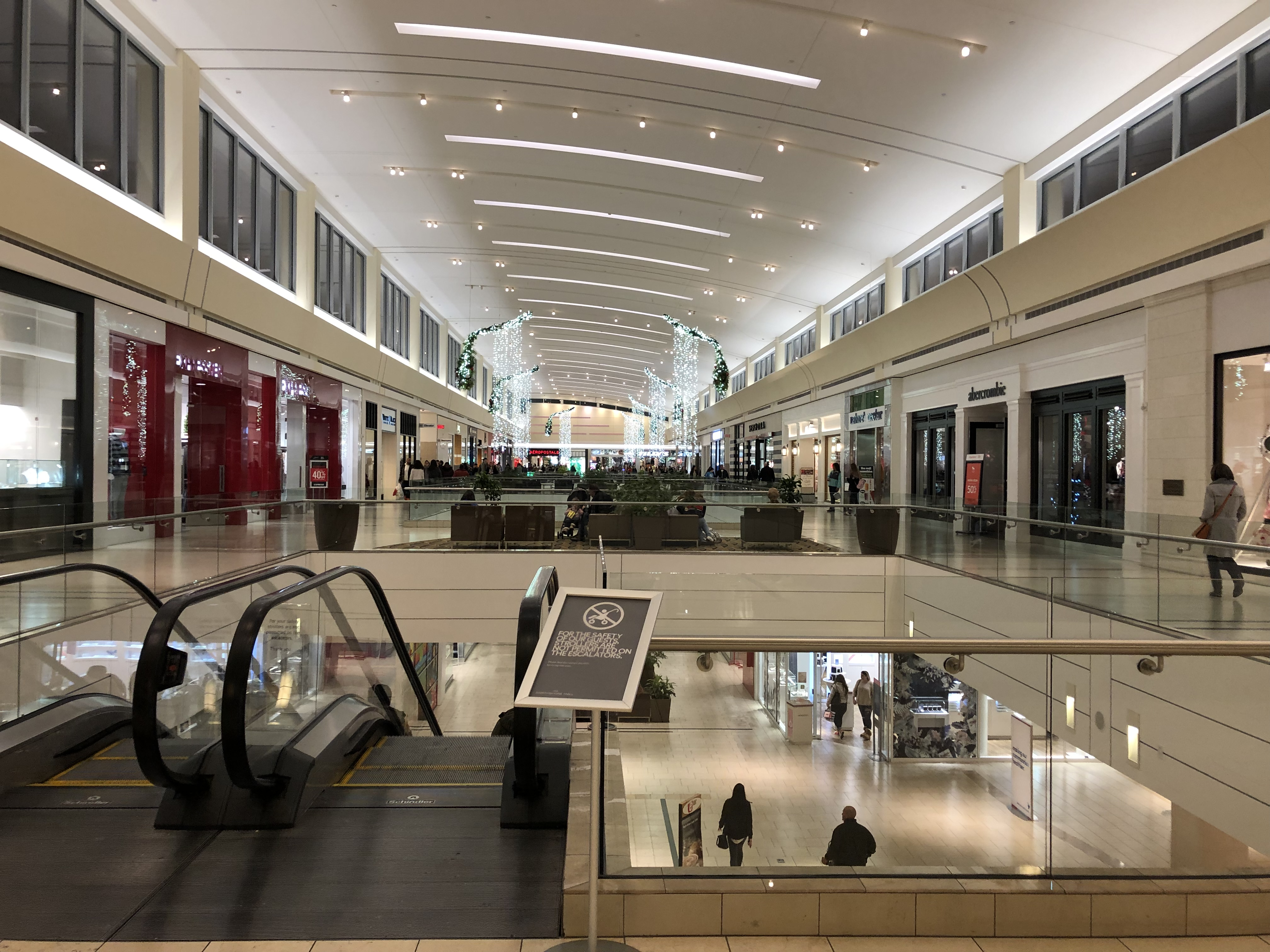
- Interior of mall (2019)
- Location: Peabody, Massachusetts, US
- Coordinates: 42°32′26″N 70°56′41″W
- Address: 210 Andover Street
- Opened: September 12, 1958; 68 years ago
- Developer: New England Development Corp.
- Manager: Simon Property Group
- Owner: Simon Property Group (56.4%)
- Num. of stores: 162
- Num. of anchor tenants: 4 (3 open, 1 under construction)
- Floor area: 1,667,004 square feet (154,869.7 m^{2})
- Floors: 1 with partial lower levels (2 in JCPenney, both Macy's locations, and future Dick's House of Sport)
- Parking: Free outdoor parking
- Website: simon.com/mall/northshore-mall

The Northshore Mall is a super-regional shopping mall in Peabody, Massachusetts. As of 2026, the mall features two Macy's locations, JCPenney, and an upcoming Dick's House of Sport as anchors.

The mall is near the Route 128 and Route 114 junction, and less than a mile from the Simon-owned Liberty Tree Mall in Danvers. The mall is 1,667,004 square feet (154,869.7 m^{2}) in size, and most of this space is located on one level, with the exception of the Dick's House of Sport wing and most anchor stores.

== History ==
The Northshore Mall Circa 1985

=== Opening and expansion ===
Plans for Greater Boston's second shopping mall were formally announced in December 1954. A $10 million retail complex was to be built on 100 acres, located 18 miles northeast of Boston, in suburban Peabody. The site had previously been a country estate. Later, it contained St. Joseph's Juniorate, a parochial school, and a dairy farm with gardens. Originally, the center had been planned for Beverly instead.

The Northshore Shopping Center opened with a dedication ceremony on September 12, 1958 as an open-air shopping center. Then-Governor of Massachusetts Foster Furcolo (D) cut the ceremonial ribbon. It was anchored by Jordan Marsh, an adjoining Filene's, and included Sears, Kresge, J.J. Newberry, R.H. Stearns, and Stop & Shop. Recreational facilities at the time included a bowling alley, a cinema, and a small amusement park called Kiddietown, next to the former Sears & Roebuck, where Office Depot is now located. The shopping center went through several changes in the 1970s and 1980s, including the expansion of Sears to a full-line anchor. Starting with a small section near the Sears store, the entire outside shopping center was enclosed in 1974-1975 to better compete with nearby Liberty Tree Mall, constructed by New England Development in 1972. Between 1977 and 1978, the mall underwent a roofing renovation which included a 2-level 240,200 square foot Sears, replacing the original store.

In 1992, Northshore Mall was acquired by New England Development, which expanded the mall to almost 1.7 million ft². On the northwest end of the mall, Filene's built a replacement store where the amusement park once was, while Lord & Taylor also constructed a new store at this end of the mall as well. Both stores had their opening in 1993. A new food court was added adjoining the original Filene's location, which was gutted and rebuilt for the addition of JCPenney. In 1999, New England Development sold the mall to a joint venture led by Simon Property Group, which also assumed management of the center. Since then there have been many smaller cosmetic upgrades and a few structural changes increasing the size. That same year a Barnes & Nobles location opened in the mall’s plaza.

The shopping center has been home to the St. Therese Society of Mt. Carmel Chapel since 1960. It is one of few chapels to be located inside of a shopping center and was the first ever built. The mall also houses the Peabody Police Department Community Outreach Center.

On September 1, 2001, the Apple Store opened. The shopping center was chosen by Apple as its first store in the Northeastern United States. When the Apple Store opened, which was located by what is now the Dick’s House of Sport wing, it was the 6th Apple Store to ever open in the world. On January 27, 2017, Apple moved the store to a new open-air shopping plaza, MarketStreet Lynnfield.

During the holiday season the mall hosts multiple photo opportunities with Santa and the Easter Bunny.

=== Redevelopment following Federated–May merger ===
Except for the renaming of Jordan Marsh to Macy's in 1996, the mall's structure and anchors remained intact until 2005, when May Department Stores (parent of Lord & Taylor and Filene's at the time) was acquired by Federated Department Stores (the owner of Macy's). In March 2006, Federated briefly closed the Filene's store, before using the space to relocate its Macy's store that May, as part of the brand's merger into Macy's. In June 2006, Simon announced an agreement with Nordstrom to open at the mall sometime in 2009. Plans called for demolishing the former Jordan Marsh to clear space for an expansion, anchored by the new Nordstrom store. Perhaps due to the increased competition, Federated announced plans to convert Lord & Taylor into Macy's Mens & Home. The new wing opened on November 4, 2009, with some of the new stores in the wing including Zara, Sephora, The North Face, Pandora, Rack Room Shoes, Swarovski, White House Black Market, The Walking Company, and Aerie. Unlike the rest of the mall, it has stores on two floors, both of which connect to and have access to Nordstrom. The food court entrance was also renovated and expanded, with the additions of The Cheesecake Factory, which opened in October 2007, and P.F. Chang's China Bistro, which opened in early 2009. The P.F. Chang's restaurant closed in 2017 and Bancroft & Co. currently occupies the space.

=== 2010s ===
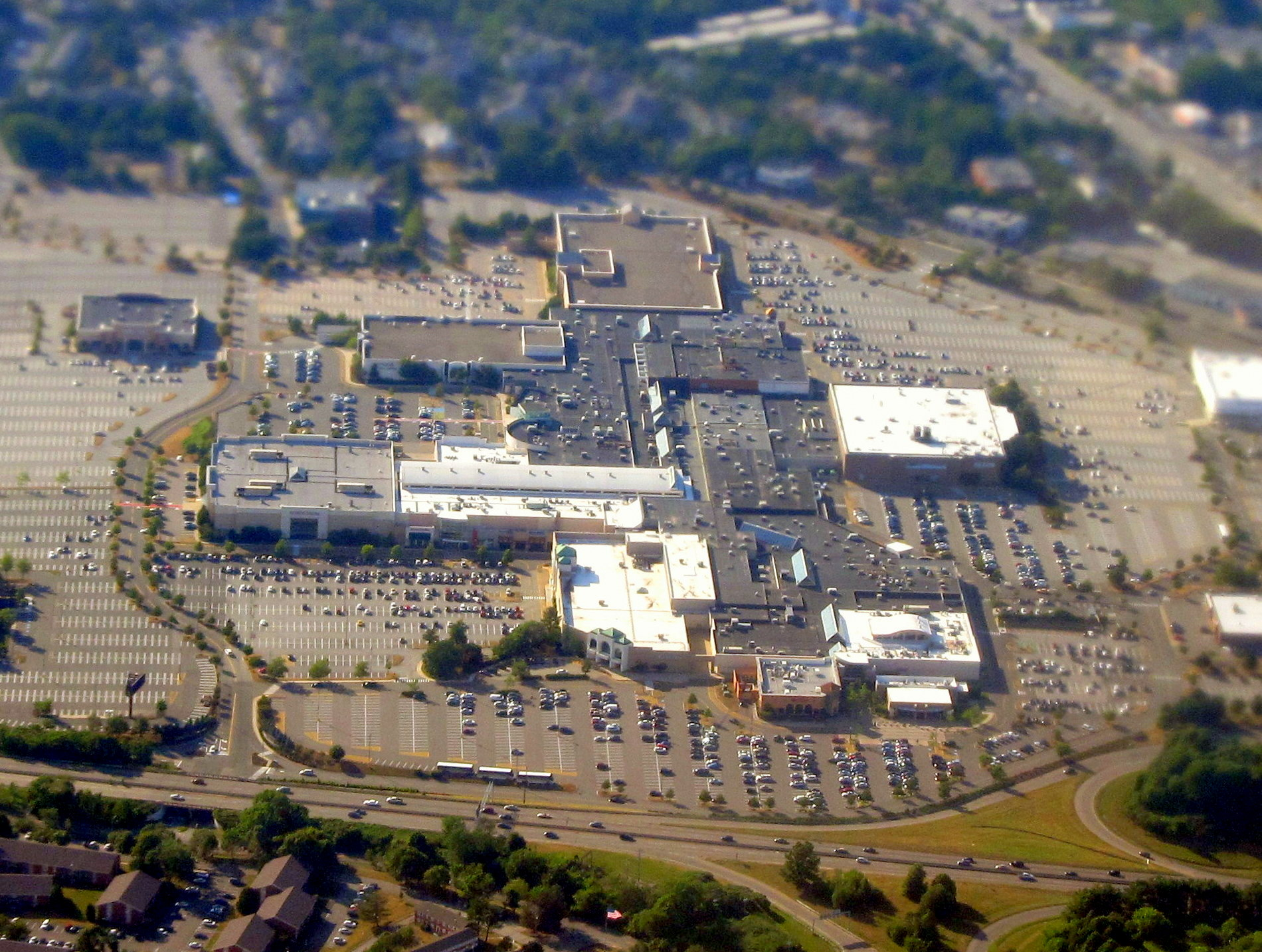
An aerial shot of the mall in 2016

Other retailers joined the mall over time, including Flying Tiger Copenhagen in 2018 as its first New England store. The Flying Tiger store closed in November 2020, alongside the other New England locations.

In 2017, renovations began outside the mall to add two new restaurants and an outdoor stage for community events and performances. Other additions include two additional fast-casual restaurants, a new patio and landscape, and renovations to the food court and restrooms. This area was named The Promenade.

On June 29, 2018, Toys "R" Us closed as part of the chain's liquidation. The store shared a 63,000-square-foot building, built in 1994 on the former Sears & Roebuck site, with an Ulta Beauty cosmetic store, according to city records. The toy store rented about 45,000 square feet, and its space is valued at $4.9 million. In February 2019, the former Toys "R" Us spot would be the new home of the PGA Tour Superstore golf shop.

On May 31, 2018, it was announced that Sears would be closing its 450,000 square foot store as part of a plan to close 78 stores nationwide. The store closed on September 2, 2018, just ten days shy of the mall's 60th anniversary. The Sears building, completed in 1978, was demolished in February 2019. Site work is ongoing to prepare for construction. At this time the hallways that accessed Sears are closed and stores occupying them have been temporarily relocated. Health club chain Life Time Inc., which has locations in Burlington and Chestnut Hill, plans to build a standalone three-story health club adjacent to the Sears site. Simon is also planning to add new restaurants to the exterior of the building surrounding a newly renovated entrance.

=== 2020s ===
The Life Time health club officially opened its facility in Summer 2021, the 130,000-square facility was built in the parking lot of the Northshore Mall.

On February 13, 2022, the new Peabody Logan Express terminal began operating at the Northshore Mall. It operated at the mall for two years when it was then moved to the Liberty Tree Mall in Danvers on August 6, 2024. In 2023, The Promenade area of the mall underwent its second phase of renovations, with multiple new stores and restaurants.

On January 7, 2025, it was announced that Nordstrom would be closing on January 31, and that Dick's House of Sport would be replacing the store. The House of Sport stores are larger than a typical Dick’s store and feature a batting cage, golf simulator, rock wall and outdoor field with a track. In April the Mall officially completed its redevelopment plan.

In February 2025, construction began for a Residence Inn by Marriott at the Northshore Mall which is scheduled to open in the fall 2026.

== Reception ==
In 2018, MassLive ranked the Northshore Mall 12th on their list of 40 shopping malls in Massachusetts, praising the malls large variety of stores and restaurants. In 2023, Boston.com included the Northshore Mall on their list of 43 malls in Massachusetts for all your shopping needs, writing, "If there’s a mall that could be legitimately considered venerable it’s the Northshore Mall."
