= Liberty Tree Mall =

Shopping mall in Massachusetts, United States

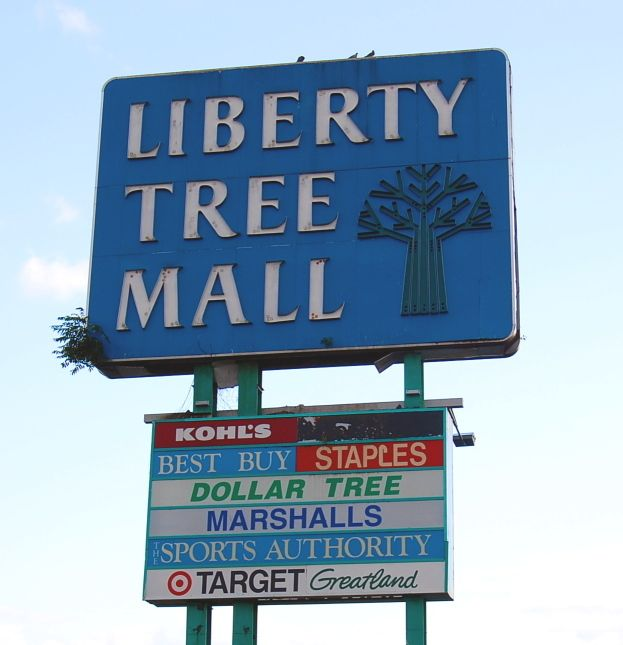
- Original sign visible from Endicott Street and Route 128 in 2008
- Location: Danvers, Massachusetts, United States
- Coordinates: 42.5524°N 70.9398°W
- Opened: February 21, 1972; 54 years ago
- Developer: New England Development
- Manager: Simon Property Group
- Owner: Simon Property Group (49.1%) and two corporate investors
- Num. of stores: 66
- Num. of anchor tenants: 7 (7 open)
- Floor area: 854,451 square feet (79,381.1 m^{2})
- Floors: 1 (2 in freestanding Dick's Sporting Goods)
- Website: www.simon.com/mall/liberty-tree-mall

The Liberty Tree Mall is a shopping mall in Danvers, Massachusetts, U.S., managed by the Simon Property Group. It is anchored by Kohl's, Total Wine & More, Marshalls, Sky Zone, and Best Buy, along with Aldi.

Simon Property Group owns one-third of the common area of the mall; the Michaels Strip Mall, and the entire interior space between Kohl's and Best Buy. The right-hand area of the property from Best Buy to Staples is owned by Target. The property from Kohl's to Dick's Sporting Goods is owned by New England Development, the mall's original developer.

== History ==
The Liberty Tree Mall c. 1985

Construction began in 1969, and the mall opened with a dedication ceremony on February 21, 1972. The mall was renovated and expanded first in 1980 and again in 1993. The mall is located less than a mile away from the Northshore Mall in Peabody, although both malls are primarily owned and managed by Simon Property Group. Since the 1980s, the Liberty Tree Mall has focused more on the discount end, whereas the Northshore Mall has focused on the mainstream/upscale end, thus enabling them to coexist semi-peacefully. Ann & Hope, one of the former anchor stores of the mall, opened in 1969 before the mall was completed. Lechmere was the mall's other anchor, which opened with the rest of the mall in 1972.

The name Liberty Tree derives from the local version of Boston's Liberty Tree, which originally stood in downtown Boston. During the early years of the mall, a large metal tree stood at the center court to commemorate the Liberty Tree. The sculpture was a featured exhibit in the New England Pavilion at the 1964–65 New York World's Fair and was designed by Albert Surman, who died in 2010. The sculpture was removed in 1992 to make room for renovations to the mall and was later scrapped in 1993.

In 1980, a food court was added that included restaurants such as The Roast House and The Fairgrounds. A Marshalls was added during the 1980s, and has been in the mall since then. Marshalls is the only remaining original anchor store. Filene's Basement, which subleased a portion of the Lechmere space in 1983, moved to the Northshore Mall in the 1990s. Sports Authority and Old Navy were added after the 1993 food court-hallway expansion. Throughout the 1980s and 1990s the mall featured a Aladdin's Castle arcade.

Lechmere and Filene's Basement were anchor stores of the mall until 1997 when they were demolished and rebuilt into Target, Staples, Dollar Tree, and Best Buy in 1998–99. An f.y.e. replaced part of an area of smaller stores, converting them into a music store/video arcade (formerly Dream Machine), both of which have since closed. Another group of stores was converted to Bed Bath & Beyond.

Ann & Hope closed their entire chain of stores in 2001, and this included the Liberty Tree Mall location. 211,300-square-foot (19,630 m^{2}) This location was later rebuilt into Kohl's. Stop & Shop and Pier 1 Imports were later built to the left of Kohl's. A Loews Theatres 20-screen multiplex was also added to the mall.

In January 2008, Stop & Shop closed. The 91,000-square-foot (8,500 m^{2}) store was originally built in 2003. The former Stop & Shop space was converted for use by Nordstrom Rack and Off Broadway Shoe Warehouse, which opened in November 2008. In 2009, the former f.y.e. was replaced by a Steve & Barry's, which stayed open until the company filed for bankruptcy.

In early 2013, PPE Casino Resorts applied to the state gambling commission for a slots parlor in the rear area of the mall, where Marshalls and the food court are located now. The announcement led to some debate, with some concerned about the character of the mall and others optimistic about jobs and revenue a slots parlor could generate for the community.

In June 2014, it was reported a Sky Zone location would opening at the Liberty Tree Mall, it was opened in October of that year. In 2016, the AMC theater at the mall underwent multiple renovations. Total Wine & More opened in April 2017, replacing Sports Authority after the company filed bankruptcy in 2016. In 2018, a Best Fitness gym chain opened at the Liberty Tree Mall.

In Summer 2019, a Netcast mini-megachurch began constructing a $2 million cafe, play space and 400-seat worship area inside the Liberty Tree Mall and opened later that year.

On November 25, 2019, it was announced that A.C. Moore would close all 145 locations, including the location at Liberty Tree Mall. That same year the town of Danvers planning board held a public hearing for a 2,200-square-foot expansion of the Liberty Tree Mall. This expansion led to a Goldfish Swim School opening in 2022.

In May 2020, Pier 1 Imports announced that it would be closing all locations and going out of business due to bankruptcy. It was later replaced by a Mainly Tubs location in 2022. In 2021, Northeast Arc a non-profit organization that supports individuals with disabilities redeveloped 26,000 square feet of the Liberty Tree Mall turning it into a community center.

On August 10, 2022, it was reported that the Liberty Tree Mall was up for sale, and had been listed since July of that year. However it has since been removed from the market.

In 2023, a Aldi location opened at the Liberty Tree Mall making it the first supermarket at the mall since Stop & Shops closer in 2008.

In August 2024, the Danvers Logan Express bus service began operating at the Mall, it had previously operated out of the Northshore Mall in Peabody. Due to this the mall stopped hosting their annual car show events "The Cruisin' the Tree car show" which was held Wednesday nights from late spring through the fall.

In 2026, the Off Broadway Shoe Warehouse closed and was replaced by a Ross Dress For Less, making it the brands first location in Massachusetts.

== List of anchor stores ==
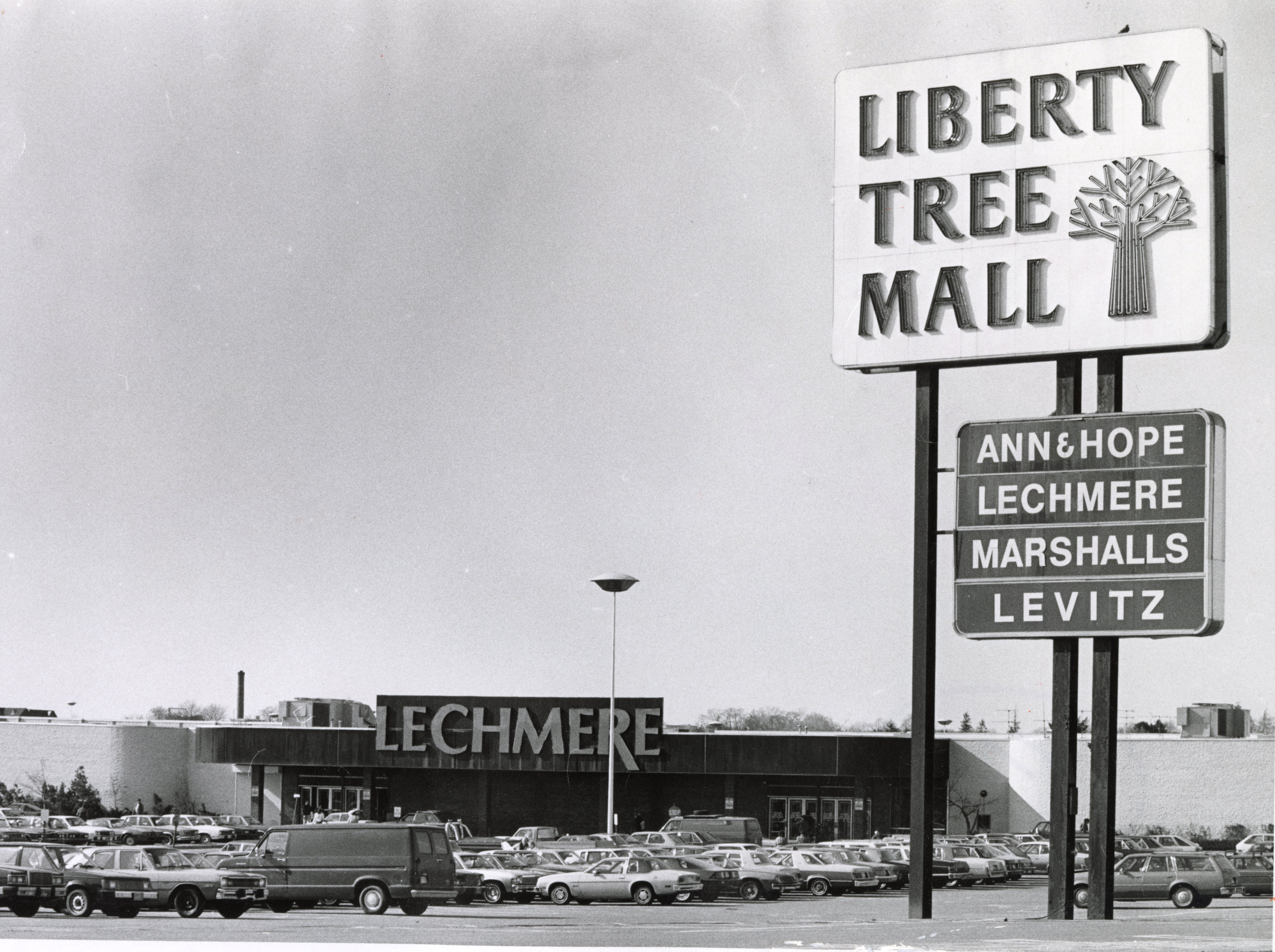
Circa 1970s

Name	Year opened	Year closed	Notes
A.C. Moore	1997	2020	
Aldi	2023	—N/a	Replaced A.C. Moore
AMC Theatres	1998	—N/a	
Ann & Hope	1969	2001	
Bed Bath & Beyond	1997	2012	Moved to former Linens 'n Things across street
Best Buy	1997	—N/a	Replaced Lechmere
Dollar Tree	1998	—N/a	
Goldfish Swim School	2022	—N/a	
Filene's Basement	1984	1997	Moved to Northshore Mall
Kohl's	2001	—N/a	Replaced Ann & Hope
Lechmere	1972	1997	
Mainely Tubs	2022	—N/a	Replaced Pier 1 Imports
Marshalls	1980	—N/a	
Nordstrom Rack	2008	—N/a	Replaced Stop & Shop
Off Broadway Shoe Warehouse	2008	2026	
Old Navy	1993	2026	Moved to Northshore Mall
Pier 1 Imports	2008	2020	
Sports Authority	1993	2016	
Staples	1998	—N/a	
Stop & Shop	2003	2008	
Sky Zone	2014	—N/a	
Target	1999	—N/a	
Total Wine & More	2017	—N/a	Replaced Sports Authority
Buffalo Wild Wings	2008	—N/a	
Ross Dress For Less	2026	—N/a	
Levitz Furniture		2008	—N/a

== Reception ==
MassLive ranked The Liberty Tree Mall at 28th on their list of 40 shopping malls in Massachusetts in December 2018. Noting the mall "appears as another mall trapped in a past time. Reviews say the mall is often dead, the layout is confusing, the food court is subpar and there is high turnover for stores inside the mall."

In 2023, Boston.com included The Liberty Tree Mall on their list of 43 malls in Massachusetts for all your shopping needs writing "The Liberty Tree Mall is a great mall to go to when you don’t want to go to "the mall." Adding "opened in 1972 with beloved local stores Lechmere and Ann & Hope as anchors, the Liberty Tree has in recent decades settled nicely into the bargain space, so as to complement the more upscale charms of the Northshore Mall down the street."
