= Quincy Adams station =

Rapid transit station in Quincy, Massachusetts, US

Quincy Adams
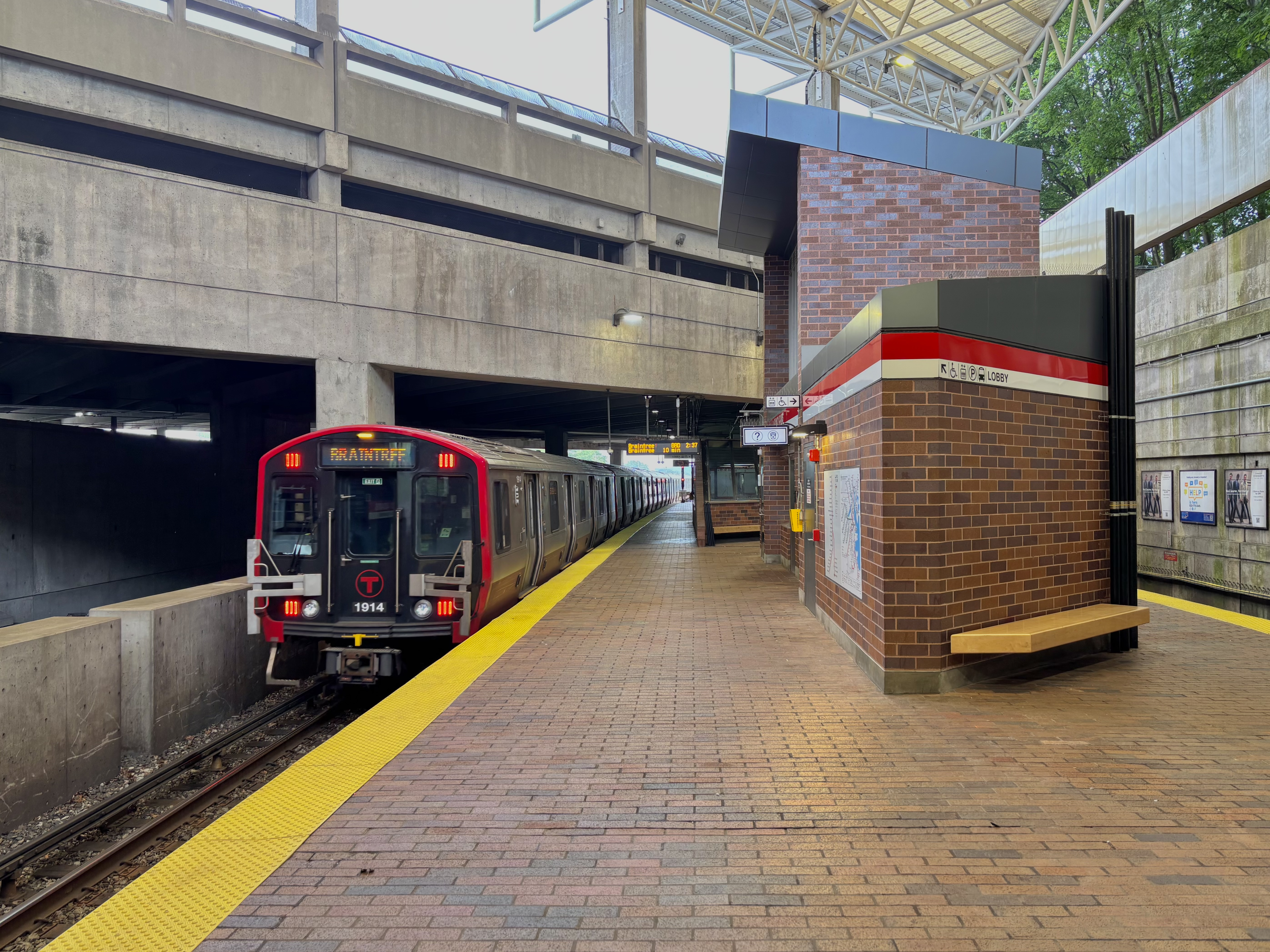
- A southbound train entering Quincy Adams station in 2025

General information
- Location: Burgin Parkway at Centre Street; Quincy, Massachusetts
- Coordinates: 42.2332°N 71.0071°W
- Line: Braintree Branch (Red Line)
- Platforms: 1 island platform
- Tracks: 2 (Red Line); 1 (Commuter rail)
- Connections: MBTA bus: 230, 238

Construction
- Parking: 2538 spaces ($9.00 fee)
- Cycle facilities: 64 spaces
- Accessible: Yes

History
- Opened: September 10, 1983
- Closed: June 30, 1959
- Former names: South Quincy (until 1867)

Passengers
- FY2019: 4,665 daily boardings

Services
| Preceding station | MBTA | Following station |
|---|---|---|
| Quincy Center toward Alewife | Red Line | Braintree Terminus |
Former services
| Preceding station | New York, New Haven and Hartford Railroad | Following station |
|---|---|---|
| Quincy toward Boston | Boston–Braintree | Braintree Terminus |
Location

Quincy Adams station is a rapid transit station in Quincy, Massachusetts. It serves the Braintree Branch of the MBTA's Red Line. Located in southern Quincy on Burgin Parkway near the Braintree Split, the station features a large park and ride garage, with space for 2,538 automobiles, built over the station tracks and platforms. It is fully accessible.

== Station layout ==
Quincy Adams station has a single island platform serving the two-track Braintree Branch of the Red Line, which runs approximately north-south through the station. A single track carrying the Fall River/New Bedford Line, Kingston Line, and Greenbush Line of the MBTA Commuter Rail system runs on the west side of the Red Line tracks. The parking garage is located mostly on the west side of the tracks, with the upper levels overhanging the Red Line tracks and platform. The station is served by MBTA bus routes 230 and 238.

== History ==
=== Old Colony Railroad ===
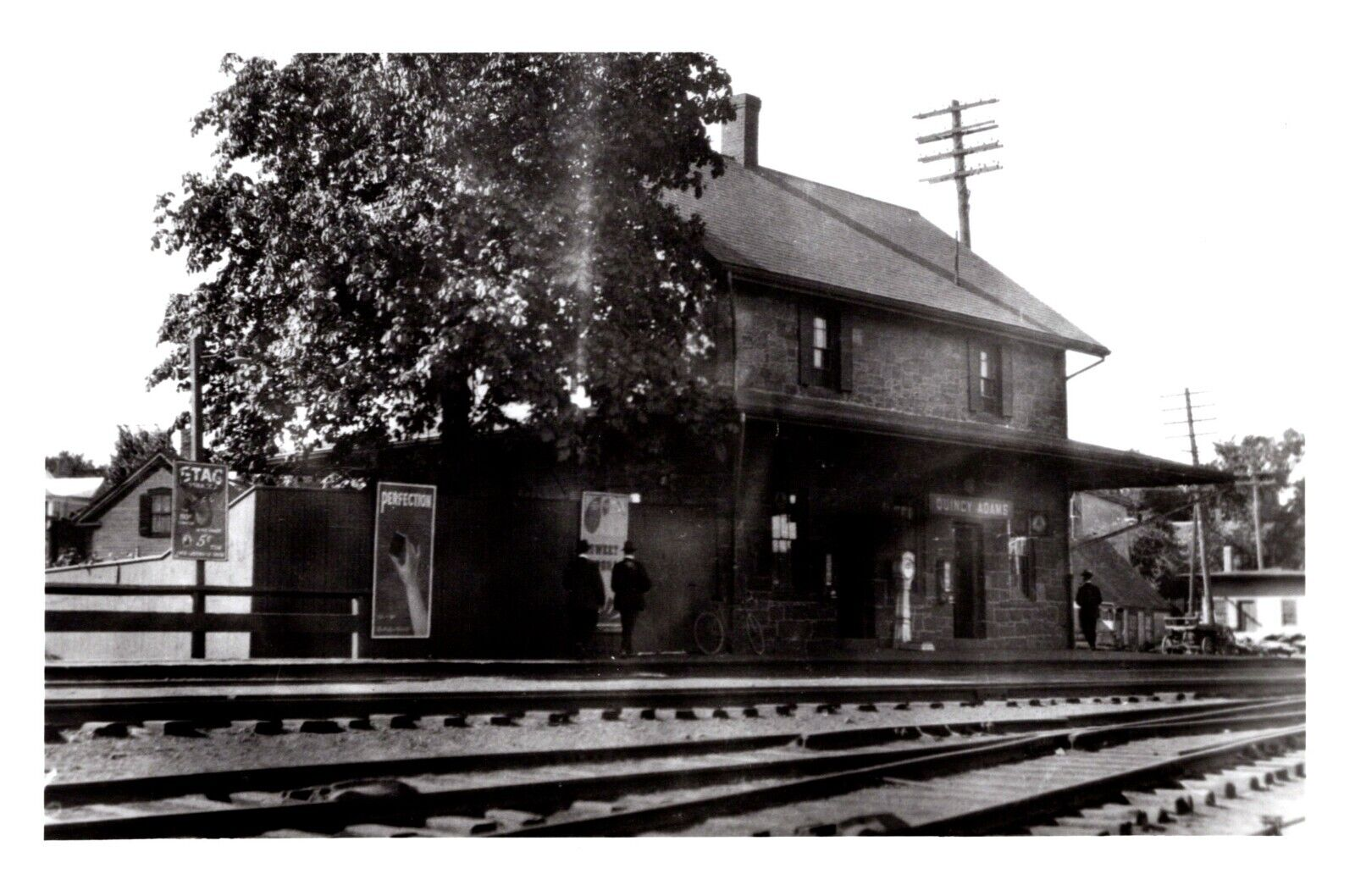
Quincy Adams station in 1916

The Old Colony Railroad opened through Quincy in November 1845. South Quincy was a flag stop for South Braintree trains by 1848. By 1857, a station was located just north of Water Street in southern Quincy. The station was known as Quincy Adams (after President John Quincy Adams, who was born nearby) by late 1866. It was officially renamed in December 1867. A stone station building was constructed in 1869; it was identical to the still-extant station at Avon, which was built around the same time. It was located on the west side of the tracks just south of Water Street. (The Old Colony had left-hand running until 1895, so the building was positioned to serve trains inbound to Boston.)

The Water Street grade crossing was eliminated in 1936 by the construction of a road bridge. The work was funded by the Works Progress Administration and cost $380,000 (equivalent to $6,700,000 in 2024). State-funded construction of platform canopies and other improvements related to the crossing elimination took place in August through November 1937.

The 1926 Report on Improved Transportation Facilities and 1945–47 Coolidge Commission Report recommended the Cambridge–Dorchester line receive a branch to Braintree along the Old Colony right-of-way. Quincy Adams station closed along with the rest of the Old Colony system on June 30, 1959, and was later demolished.

=== Red Line opening ===
The MBTA received a $21 million federal grant (with $5 million local match required) in July 1976 for the construction of South Quincy station. The station (renamed Quincy Adams) opened on September 10, 1983 as an infill station on the Braintree Branch, which had been extended to Braintree on March 22, 1980. The station was completed by early 1983, but its opening was delayed until direct ramps between Burgin Parkway and the highways at the Braintree Split were opened. The station ultimately cost $32 million to build. It has been accessible since at least 1989.

From their openings until 2007, a double entry fare and single exit fare were charged at Quincy Adams and Braintree when leaving the subway, as a proxy for distance-based fares. The extra fares was discontinued as part of a fare increase and service change on January 1, 2007. Similar charges existed until 1980 for the inner stations on the Braintree Branch.

=== Renovations ===
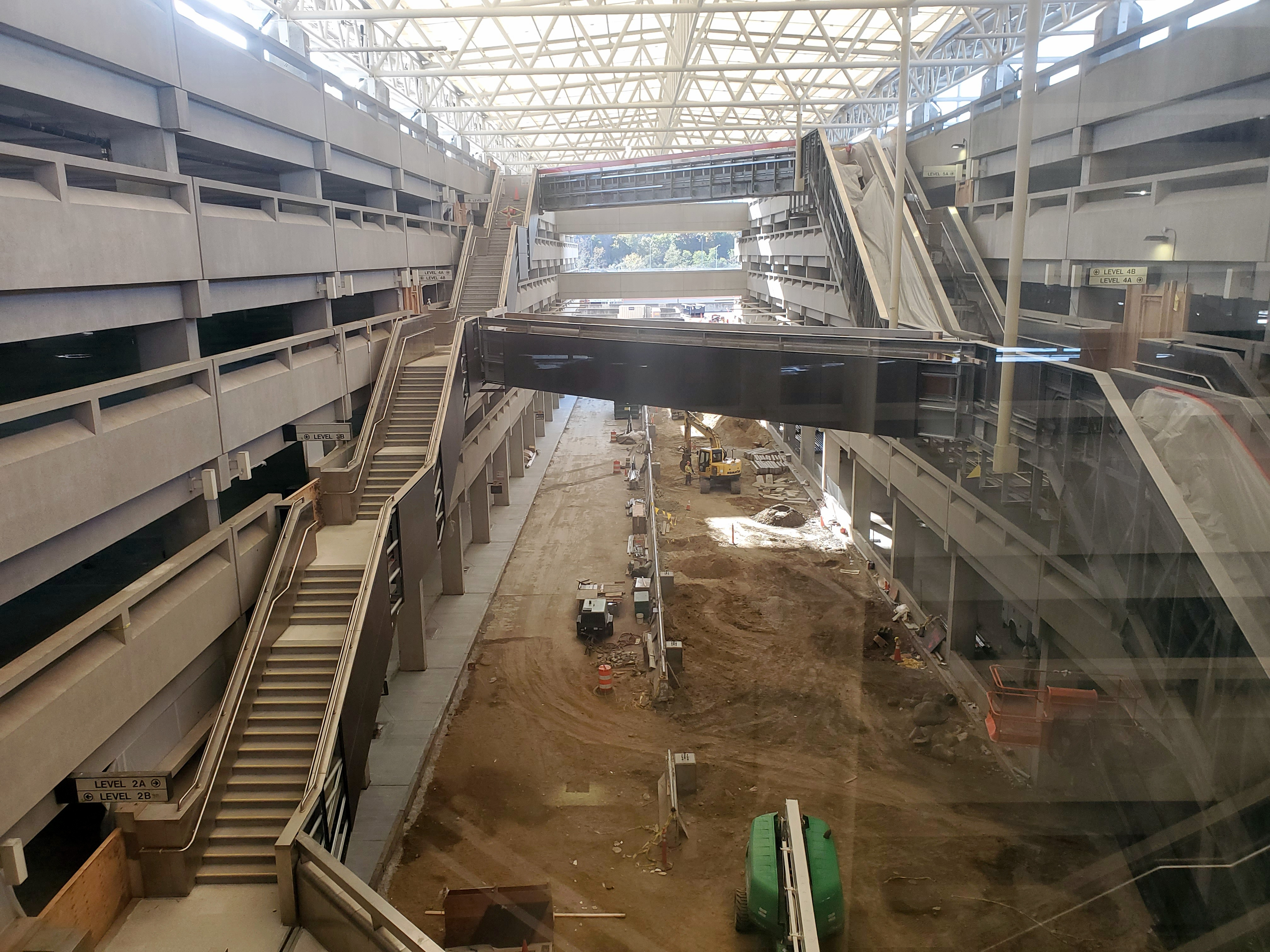
Garage reconstruction work in November 2020

Until 2012, access to the garage had only been from ramps off Interstate 93 and Route 3, with the Burgin Parkway entrance leading only to a 160-space surface lot. In July 2012, after the closure of the garage at Quincy Center due to structural issues, the 130-space lower level of the garage was made accessible from Burgin Parkway as well.

Although built to last 50 years, the $28 million garage at Quincy Adams began suffering concrete damage due to water leakage and ill-fitting structural elements. Repairs were performed to the Quincy Adams and Braintree garages in the mid 1990s. In 2015, the MBTA began a $4.4 million project to address urgent structural issues with the two garages, though full repair or replacement was still needed. The garage was fully renovated from May 2018 through December 2021 at a cost of $35 million; the station and garage were originally planned to remain open during the whole project. The garage was closed from October 5, 2020, to April 20, 2021, when it partially reopened.

A separate $10.5 million project, which began in August 2018, involved the replacement of the two existing garage elevators and single platform elevator plus the addition of a redundant platform elevator. One garage elevator was completed in late 2020, followed by the new platform elevator in 2021. The second garage elevator was completed in early 2022, followed by the replacement of the existing platform elevator in October 2023.

=== Independence Avenue entrance ===
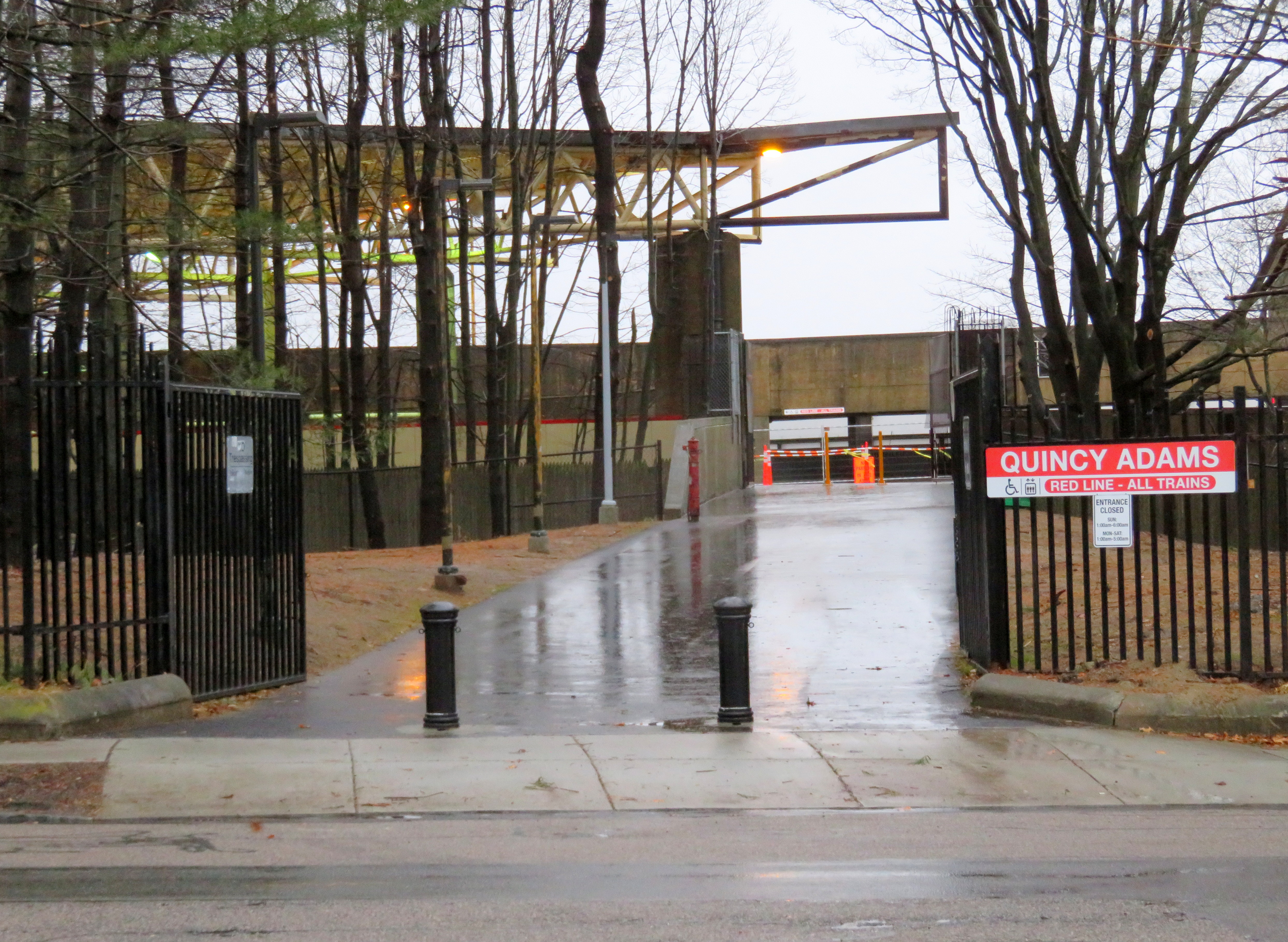
The newly-reopened Independence Avenue entrance in December 2018

Until December 2018, the only pedestrian access to the station was via the park and ride garage off Burgin Parkway. The MBTA opened a pedestrian entrance on the east side of the station leading to Independence Avenue in 1981. However, the streets surrounding that entrance were frequently used for parking by riders seeking to avoid paying for the parking garage. In the late 1980s, the entrance was closed, leaving neighborhood residents without station access. Some neighborhood residents climbed over the gate to use the station. The entrance was a point of contention between the cities of Quincy and Braintree; in February 2014, officials from the two towns proposed that a lock system be created where only nearby residents could enter from Independence Avenue.

The garage improvements included repairs to the pathway from Independence Avenue, but the MBTA claimed that the entrance was a "city issue" and did not plan to reopen it as part of the project. In April 2018, the city announced that the gate would be opened by September of that year. The gate was ultimately opened on December 3, 2018. A 2019 MBTA analysis found that relatively few riders were using the entrance.

=== Bus service ===
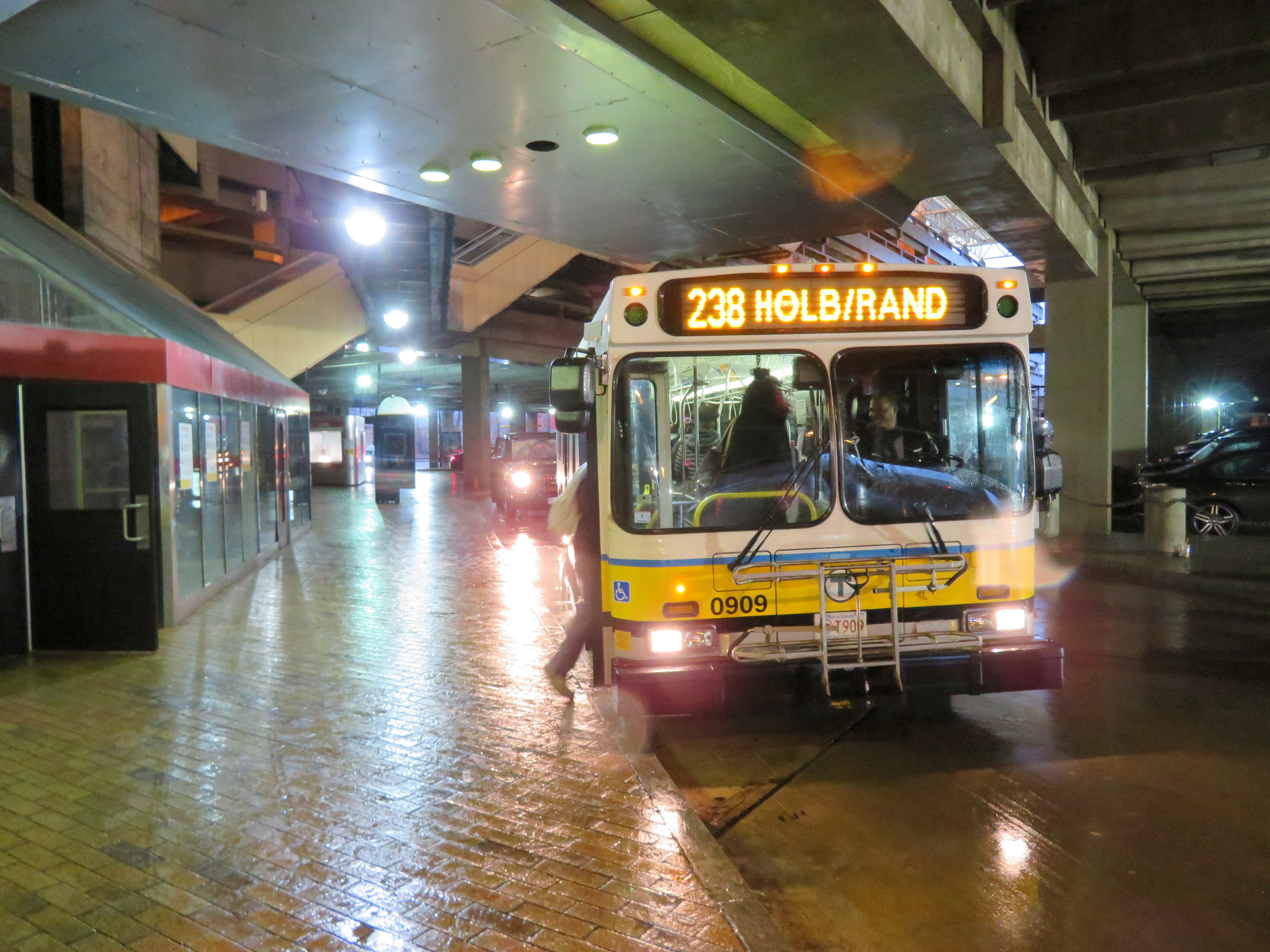
A route 238 bus using the busway in 2018

The station was built with a busway (bus transfer facility) for MBTA bus routes, with entry from Centre Street and exit to Burgin Parkway, but it has remained underutilized throughout the history of the station. The busway has never served as a terminal for any regular MBTA bus route, and only route 238 uses it. However, several other services have used the busway at various times.

- In November 1985, one-week trials were run of MBTA express service directly from Alewife and Quincy Adams to Logan International Airport. The Quincy Adams service was considered successful; full-time service contracted by Massport began on September 29, 1986, as the first route of what would become the Logan Express network. In 1990, the terminal was moved from Quincy Adams to a parking lot near Braintree.
- Two special MBTA routes were run from Quincy Adams and Riverside to the Museum of Fine Arts during a Monet exhibition at the museum, which ran from February 7 to April 29, 1990.
- Beginning in August 1999, Interstate Coach operated reverse commute bus service from Boston to a business park in Canton, with intermediate stops at JFK/UMass and Quincy Adams. The service was operated by Bloom Bus Lines after it acquired Interstate in August 2003, but discontinued in July 2004.
- Beginning with the 1994 season, the MBTA subsidized private-carrier service from Forest Hills, Alewife, Riverside, and Quincy Adams to Foxboro Stadium for New England Patriots home games. Service from the latter three stations lasted until the 2000 season.
