= West Quincy (Quincy, Massachusetts) =

Coordinates: 42.253°N 71.033°W

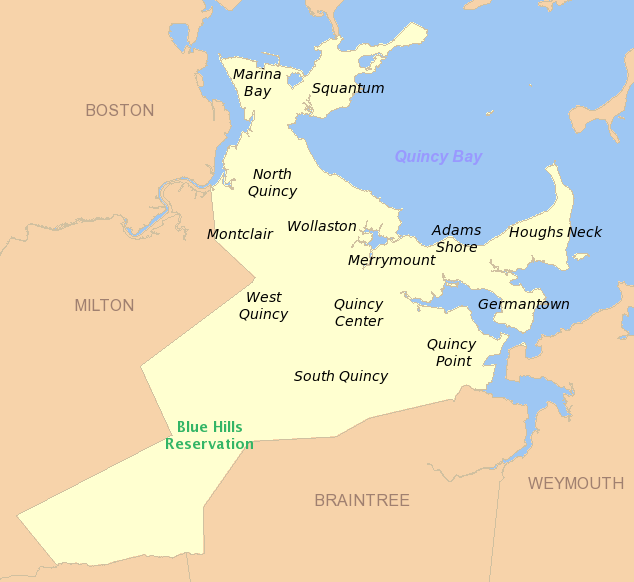
Map of Quincy neighborhoods

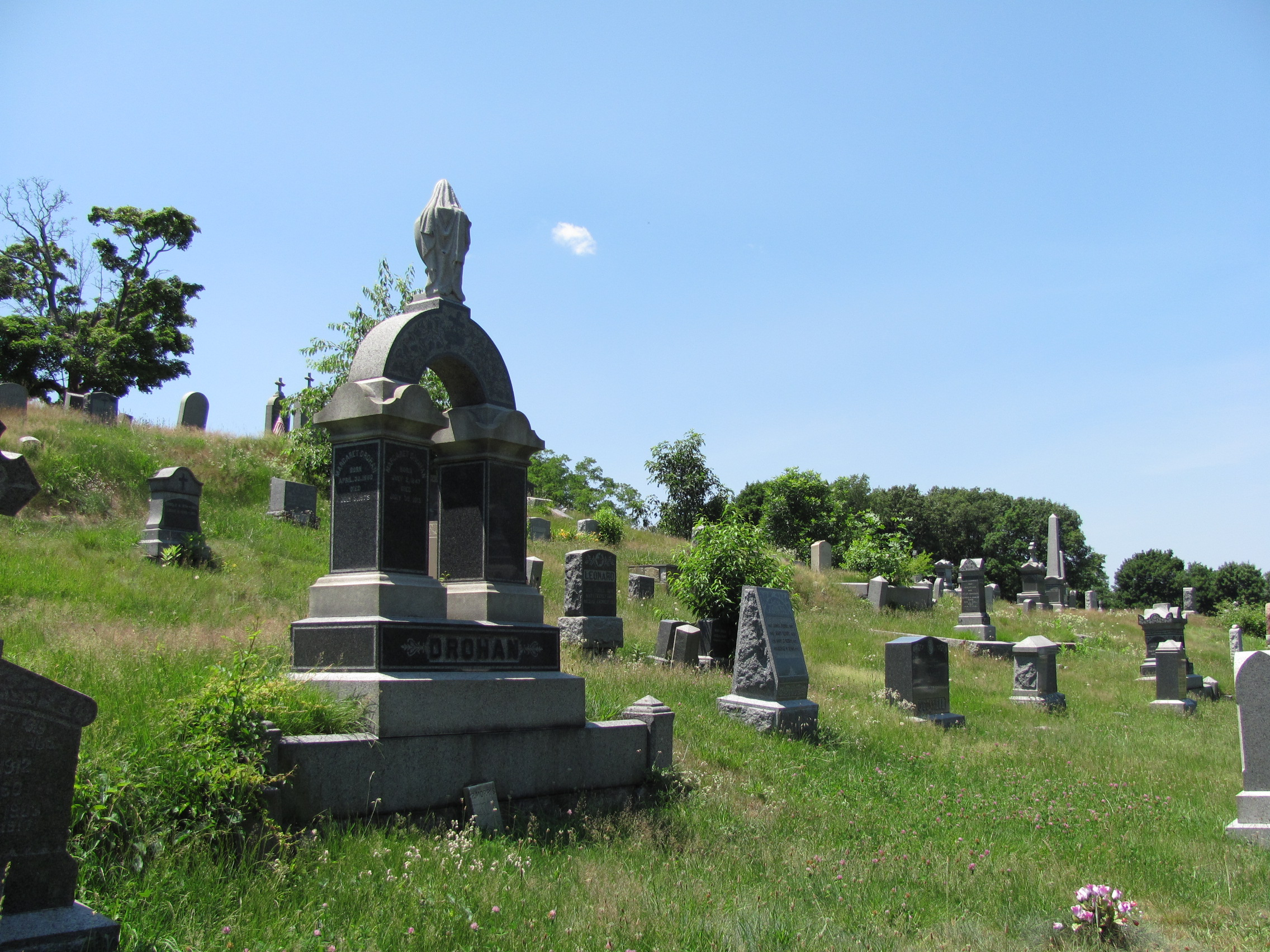
St. Mary's Cemetery

West Quincy is a neighborhood of Quincy, Massachusetts. It is bordered on the north by Wollaston, on the east by Quincy Center, on the south by South Quincy and on the west by the town of Milton and the Blue Hills Reservation.

== Transportation ==
Adams Street, Copeland Street, Furnace Brook Parkway, Quarry Street and Willard Street are major thoroughfares in West Quincy. Interstate 93 runs south-north through the neighborhood along Willard Street and the former route of the Granite Railway, with Exit 8 at Furnace Brook Parkway and Exit 9 at Bryant Avenue allowing direct access to West Quincy. Massachusetts Route 37 formerly ran along Willard Street to Granite Avenue in Milton, ending at Gallivan Boulevard in Boston. This alignment was changed in 1968, with Route 37 now ending in the town of Braintree. West Quincy is served by bus routes 215, 238, and 245 of the Massachusetts Bay Transportation Authority, with connections to the subway and commuter rail via Quincy Center station.
