= Paul Blart: Mall Cop =

2009 film by Steve Carr

- Theatrical release poster
- Directed by: Steve Carr
- Written by: Kevin James; Nick Bakay
- Produced by: Adam Sandler; Jack Giarraputo; Kevin James; Todd Garner; Barry Bernardi
- Starring: Kevin James; Jayma Mays; Keir O'Donnell; Bobby Cannavale; Stephen Rannazzisi; Shirley Knight; Raini Rodriguez
- Cinematography: Russ T. Alsobrook
- Edited by: Jeff Freeman
- Music by: Waddy Wachtel
- Production companies: Columbia Pictures; Happy Madison Productions; Relativity Media
- Distributed by: Sony Pictures Releasing
- Release date: January 16, 2009
- Running time: 91 minutes
- Country: United States
- Language: English
- Budget: $26 million
- Box office: $186 million

Paul Blart: Mall Cop is a 2009 American action comedy film directed by Steve Carr, written by Kevin James and Nick Bakay, and produced by James, Adam Sandler, Jack Giarraputo, Todd Garner, and Barry Bernardi. It stars James as the titular character with Jayma Mays, Keir O'Donnell, Bobby Cannavale, Stephen Rannazzisi and Shirley Knight in supporting roles. The film tells the story of Paul Blart, a single dad and a bumbling mall security guard, who finds himself in the middle of a heist and the only person in position to rescue hostages. Filming began in February 2008 with a majority of the shooting taking place at the Burlington Mall in Burlington, Massachusetts; it was produced by Adam Sandler's Happy Madison Productions and in association with Relativity Media.

Paul Blart: Mall Cop was released in the United States on January 16, 2009, by Sony Pictures Releasing. The film grossed $186 million worldwide against a production budget of $26 million, but was not well received by critics apart from positive comments about James' performance. A sequel titled Paul Blart: Mall Cop 2 was released in 2015.

== Plot ==
Paul Blart lives in West Orange, New Jersey with his young daughter Maya and his mother. Aspiring to join the New Jersey State Police, he trains at the police academy, but his hypoglycemia causes him to collapse before finishing the physical fitness test, leading Paul to take a job as a security officer at the West Orange Pavilion Mall.

Paul patrols the mall on a Segway and begins training Veck Simms, who shows little interest in the job. Meanwhile, Paul becomes acquainted with Amy Anderson, a vendor of a new kiosk. Paul meets her one evening at a restaurant with other mall employees. Things initially go well, but when Paul participates in a nacho-eating contest with his friend Leon, the jalapeño peppers prove too spicy for him, and he chugs two glasses of margarita, mistaking it for lemonade. He gets drunk and makes a wild exit by falling through a window.

Two days later on Black Friday, an organized gang of thugs disguised as Santa's Village employees begin a heist inside the mall. They take Amy, Stuart, Leon, Mr. Ferguson and the bank workers hostage in the bank, and Veck is revealed to be the gang's leader. The goons force the majority of shoppers to exit the mall and place motion sensors at each entrance to detect any attempt to enter or exit the building.

Paul is oblivious as he plays Rock Band before walking back into the mall to discover that it is nearly empty. He calls the police and leaves the mall, but realizes that Amy is still inside when he spots her car and returns to the mall to look for her. A SWAT team arrives with commander James Kent at the helm. Kent, a former classmate and bully from Paul's childhood, takes control of the police units and orders Blart to let them handle the situation. Paul refuses and attempts a rescue. Vastly outnumbered, he takes a stand against Veck's crew, improvising to take them down one by one. He discovers credit card codes written in invisible ink on the burglars' arms, realizing that their plans go beyond robbing the bank.

Unaware of this, Maya shows up at the mall to bring Paul some food, but Veck's henchmen seize her and add her to the hostages. Paul manages to subdue all of Veck's accomplices and attempts to rescue the hostages by pulling them up into the air vent. The plan fails when Leon does not fit. Veck enters the room, capturing Paul and forcing him to give up the codes recorded on his cell phone. Veck flees, taking Amy and Maya with him. As the SWAT team raids the mall, Paul borrows a display minivan with Kent, pursuing Veck to the airport, where he is attempting to escape to the Cayman Islands.

After a brief scuffle, Paul overpowers Veck and puts him in handcuffs. Kent pulls his gun on Paul, revealing that he was working with Veck. Kent demands the phone containing the codes from Paul, who instead destroys it. Before Kent can retaliate by shooting Paul, Chief Brooks of the mall security team arrives and shoots him in the arm. He and Veck are both arrested, and Amy and Maya are returned safely. For his bravery and assistance, Howard offers Paul a job with the New Jersey State Police. Paul declines, preferring to remain in mall security. Paul and Amy are eventually married in the mall, where they exchange vows on a set of black and white Segways.

== Cast ==
- Kevin James as Paul Blart, a dedicated Mall Security Officer suffering from hypoglycemia
- Jayma Mays as Amy Anderson, a weave and wig salesperson whom Paul has an affection for and one of the hostages
- Keir O'Donnell as Veck Simms, a security trainee and ringleader of the Mall heist
- Bobby Cannavale as Commander James Kent, a corrupt officer in the New Jersey State Police SWAT team who secretly works with Veck Simms
- Adam Ferrara as Sergeant Howard, a detective in New Jersey State Police who oversees the heist/hostage situation
- Peter Gerety as Chief Brooks, Paul's supervisor
- Stephen Rannazzisi as Stuart, a pen salesman making his move on Amy and one of the hostages
- Shirley Knight as Margaret Blart, Paul's mother and Maya's paternal grandmother
- Jamal Mixon as Leon, a heavyset mall kiosk worker and one of the hostages
- Adhir Kalyan as Pahud, Parisa's boyfriend in contact with Paul via her phone
- Erick Avari as Vijay, owner of a cellphone kiosk who loans Paul a phone after punishing his daughter, Parisa
- Raini Rodriguez as Maya Blart, Paul's daughter who later gets taken hostage
- Mike Vallely as Rudolph, one of Veck's lead criminals in the heist
- Mike Escamilla as Blitzen, one of Veck's criminals in the heist
- Jason Ellis as Prancer, one of Veck's criminals in the heist
- Jason Packham as Comet, one of Veck's lead criminals in the heist
- Rick Thorne as Cupid, one of Veck's criminals in the heist
- Victor T. Lopez as Donner, one of Veck's criminals in the heist
- Natasha Hopkins as Vixen, one of Veck's criminals in the heist
- Mookie Barker as Mr. Ferguson, the arcade owner and one of the hostages
- Richie Minervini as the Bank Manager and one of the hostages
- Brie Arbaugh as the Bank Teller and one of the hostages

== Production ==
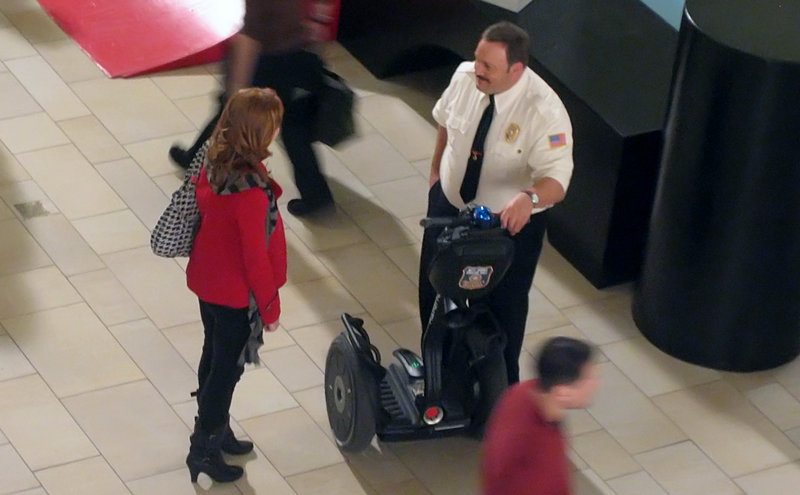
On set at the Burlington Mall

Production began in late February 2008 in Boston. Principal photography took place at the Burlington Mall in Burlington, Massachusetts, after being denied a permit to film at Willowbrook Mall in Wayne, New Jersey. From late February until mid-April, the mall and its stores were decorated with Christmas decorations, and there was a large prop ball-pit in the main foyer of the mall near the Sears branch, and a Santa's Village at the opposite end near the Macy's branch where the mall usually puts its own Santa's Village. Interior filming took place mostly at night. Some of the aerial stunts, such as Blart being attacked in the scenic elevator, were performed at the South Shore Plaza in Braintree, Massachusetts, as the Burlington Mall's construction did not allow for some of these stunts.

== Reception ==
=== Critical reception ===
On the review aggregator website Rotten Tomatoes, 34% of 116 critics' reviews are positive, with an average rating of 4.8/10. The website's consensus reads: "Paul Blart: Mall Cop has some laughs, but its plot is flimsy and lacking in any sustained comic momentum." Metacritic, which uses a weighted average, assigned the film a score of 39 out of 100, based on 24 critics, indicating "generally unfavorable" reviews. Audiences surveyed by CinemaScore gave the film a grade B on scale of A to F.

Peter Travers of Rolling Stone gave the film one star out of four, panning the concept and juvenile humor.

Variety's Brian Lowry called it "An almost shockingly amateurish one-note-joke comedy."

James Berardinelli was also unimpressed by the juvenile tone, but praised the character of Paul Blart and a refreshing change from Adam Sandler's typical films calling it "a passable choice for watching at home, when viewers tend to be less demanding."

Roger Ebert of the Chicago Sun-Times gave it three stars out of four, praising the film's "wholesome" comedy.

Nathan Rabin of The A.V. Club gave the film a grade C−, calling it "a shamelessly sentimental comedy with a few crude gags thrown in arbitrarily" which "turns into a stale riff on Die Hard."

=== Box office ===
The film ranked #1 at the domestic box office with $9,791,368 from 3,144 theaters for an opening day average of $3,105. During the film's entire three-day opening weekend, it remained at the top spot, grossing a total of $31,832,636, with a per screen average of $10,125, outgrossing its $26 million budget. It grossed $39,234,238 over the entire four-day MLK weekend, for a four-day average of $12,479. The film was the second best opening of all-time for the MLK weekend, behind 2008's Cloverfield. The film stayed at number one in its second weekend, grossing another $21,623,182, dropping just 32%, and boosting the ten day income to $64,923,380. In its third weekend, it dropped to second place with $13,872,751, a 36% decline from the last weekend, for an average of $4,327 from 3,206 theaters, bringing the seventeen day gross to $83,247,655. In its fourth weekend, it dropped to fifth place with $10,884,825, a drop of 22% from the last weekend, for an average of $3,435 from 3,169 theaters, and bringing the 24-day tally to $96,886,687. In its fifth weekend (President's Day weekend), it dropped to sixth place, making another $10,983,319 over the three-day span, actually increasing 1%, for an average of $3,704 from 2,965 theaters, and bringing the 31-day total to $109,787,819, having broken the $100 million mark on Friday, February 13. Over the four-day President's Day weekend, it made $13,574,027 for an average of $4,578, and bringing the 32-day cume to $112,388,524. The film closed on Monday, May 25, 2009, with a final domestic gross of $146,336,178, with the three-day opening weekend making up 21.75% of the total gross (26.81% for the four-day opening weekend). The film had as of 2009 made $36,625,591 internationally, bringing the total worldwide gross to $183,293,131, against a modest $26 million budget.

=== Home media ===
Paul Blart: Mall Cop was released on DVD, Blu-ray, and UMD on May 19, 2009, by Sony Pictures Home Entertainment. The DVD sold 1,817,747 copies, making US $29,411,146 for the week of May 24, 2009, having only been out for six days, and it ranked No. 1 for DVD sales that week as well. For the week of May 31, 2009, it again made No. 1 on the US DVD Charts as it sold an additional 553,681 copies and making US$9,921,964 for a total of 2,834,826 units sold with earnings of US$46,676,902 as of November 1, 2009. As of November 1, 2009, when combined with box office results and total DVD sales, the film has grossed a total of US$227,126,523.

== Sequel ==
Sony expressed interest in producing a sequel to the film in January 2009. In early 2014, it was confirmed that the studio was moving forward, and shooting began in April 2014. Andy Fickman was hired to direct the sequel, while Kevin James co-wrote the script with Nick Bakay and returned to star in the leading role. The sequel was titled Paul Blart: Mall Cop 2 and was released on April 17, 2015.

== See also ==
- Observe and Report
- Twin films
