= South Shore Plaza =

Shopping mall in Norfolk County, Massachusetts, U.S.

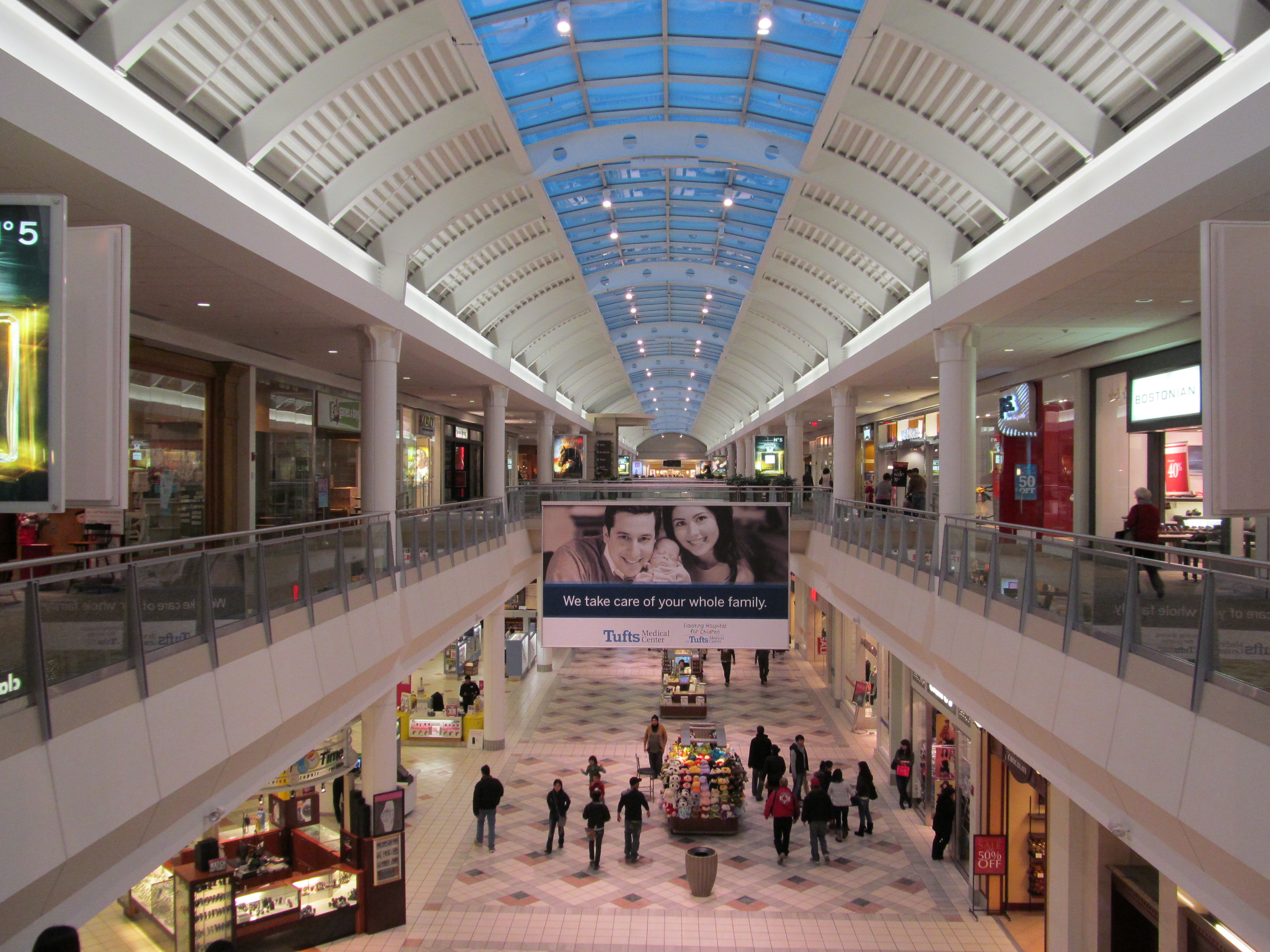
- Mall interior looking toward the former Nordstrom wing (2012)
- Location: Braintree, Massachusetts, U.S.
- Coordinates: 42.22044°N 71.02387°W
- Address: 250 Granite Street
- Opened: 1961; 65 years ago
- Renovated: 1995–1996; 2008–2010
- Manager: Simon Property Group
- Owner: Simon Property Group
- Num. of stores: 192
- Num. of anchor tenants: 4
- Floor area: 1,586,446 square feet (147,385.7 m^{2}) of gross leasable area
- Floors: 2 (3 in Dick's House of Sport, 4 in former Jordan Marsh, plus partial basement level)
- Website: simon.com/mall/south-shore-plaza

South Shore Plaza is a super-regional shopping mall in Braintree, Massachusetts, United States. The mall spans 1,586,446 square feet (147,385.7 m^{2}) of selling space, making it the 16th-largest mall in the country. The mall was anchored by Filene's when it opened as an open-air plaza in 1961. Jordan Marsh, Lord & Taylor, and Sears opened stores around the time the mall was enclosed in 1976. As of March 2025, the mall is anchored by Sears, Macy's, Primark, and Target, with Dick's House of Sport filling the vacancy left by Nordstrom by 2026.

== History ==
=== Opening and early expansions ===
South Shore Plaza originally opened in 1961 as an open-air plaza with a 120,000 sq ft (11,000 m^{2}) Filene's and thirty smaller stores. A 300,316 sq ft (27,900 m^{2}) Jordan Marsh opened in 1967. The center was enclosed in 1976 and saw additional anchors, such as Lord & Taylor in 1979 and Sears in 1980, when the mall reached 100 stores. In 1995 and 1996, a second level was added, including the "Boardwalk Cafes" food court, and the Filene's store was expanded to include a home store. This nearly doubled the mall's size, giving it a bright and airy feel, largely because of abundant skylighting and spacious corridors.

=== Macy's conversions ===
Also in 1996, the Jordan Marsh store was renamed Macy's. In 1998, Simon Property Group acquired the mall owner, Corporate Property Investors, and assumed management.

In 2005, May Department Stores, at the time the parent of Lord & Taylor and Filene's, was acquired by Federated Department Stores, the owner of Macy's. As a result, the Filene's store was briefly closed in March 2006, before using the space to relocate its Macy's store that May. The remainder of the Filene's stores were converted Macy's later that year. Federated sold the Lord & Taylor chain later that year and sold the vacant Jordan Marsh/Macy's space to Simon Property Group. Filene's Basement, one of the mall's former anchors, filed for bankruptcy protection on May 4, 2009. New York's Crown Acquisitions made a bid to buy Filene's Basement including their famous Downtown Crossing location which closed for reconstruction in 2007. The South Shore Plaza store in Braintree closed in December 2011.

=== 2010 expansion and renovation ===
A redevelopment opened on the former site of Jordan Marsh on March 26, 2010. The center now holds 2,165,000 sq ft (201,100 m^{2}), making it New England's largest mall, and includes a newly constructed three-level, 150,000 sq ft (14,000 m^{2}) Nordstrom, though the Jordan Marsh building was four stories. Simon Property Group announced on May 12, 2009, that they were in negotiations with the town of Braintree and Target to include a Target store on the lowest level of the 3 level mall addition. Its grand opening was on October 10, 2010. Numerous high-end retailers have joined the mall in the Nordstrom wing, including Sur La Table, Vera Bradley, and Sephora. The mall also received new carpeting, wall decor, food court seating/televisions, and signage as part of the renovations. The parking deck bridges that once connected to Jordan Marsh have now been restored.

In 2017, Irish clothing retailer, Primark, opened in the former top level of Sears.

On August 27, 2020, Lord & Taylor announced the closure of all of its stores, as a result of the economic impact of the COVID-19 pandemic.

Nordstrom closed on March 8, 2025. Dick's House of Sport is set to open in the former Nordstrom space by 2026.

== In pop culture ==
In 2008, this mall, along with the Burlington Mall in Burlington, Massachusetts, was used to film sequences of the movie Paul Blart: Mall Cop.
