= Stephen R. Karp =

American real estate developer

- Born: 1941 (age 84–85)
- Education: B.A. Boston University
- Known for: Chairman and CEO of New England Development
- Spouse: Jill Karp
- Children: Douglass Karp; Jana Karp
- Parent(s): Beatrice Taylor Karp; Harold Karp

Stephen R. Karp (born 1941) is an American real estate developer and billionaire.

== Biography ==
Karp was born to Beatrice G. (née Taylor) and Harold Karp. Karp worked construction during the summer while attending Boston University where he graduated. After school, he worked for a real estate development firm whom he convinced to partner with him to develop a shopping center in Danvers, Massachusetts named the Liberty Tree Mall, one of the first enclosed malls in the Northeast. The mall opened in 1972 and was successful. In 1978, he founded his real estate development company New England Development and then went on to develop over 20 malls before selling 14 of them for $1.75 billion to the Simon Property Group.

Karp served as chairman of the Board of Trustees of the International Council of Shopping Centers and is a member of the Greater Boston Real Estate Board and the Urban Land Institute.

== Philanthropy ==
In 2013, Karp received the Combined Jewish Philanthropies (CJP) Edwin N. Sidman Leadership Award. He served as chairman of the Board of Trustees of Boston Children's Hospital, as a trustee and chairman of Children's Hospital Trust, and as chairman of the Dana-Farber/Children’s Hospital Cancer Care; he also served on the Board of Trustees of Boston University, Belmont Hill School, and the Boston Youth Sanctuary. He is on the Board of Overseers of Newton-Wellesley Hospital and the Boston Symphony Orchestra.

== Personal life ==
Karp is married to Jill Karp and has two children: Douglass and Jana. His son Doug along with his best friend Ben Fischman (and son of New England Development's Vice Chairman Steven Fischman) co-founded the baseball cap retailer, Lids.
