= Charles Ufford =

Charles A. "Charlie" Ufford (died October 9, 1929) was the father of the Dorchester Tunnel plan, the portion of what is now the MBTA Red Line that runs from Andrew Square to Fields Corner and onward to Ashmont.

He was also President of the Boston Lake Shore Home for Tired Mothers and Poor Children, and Vice President of the Dorchester Historical Society.

== Mass transit ==
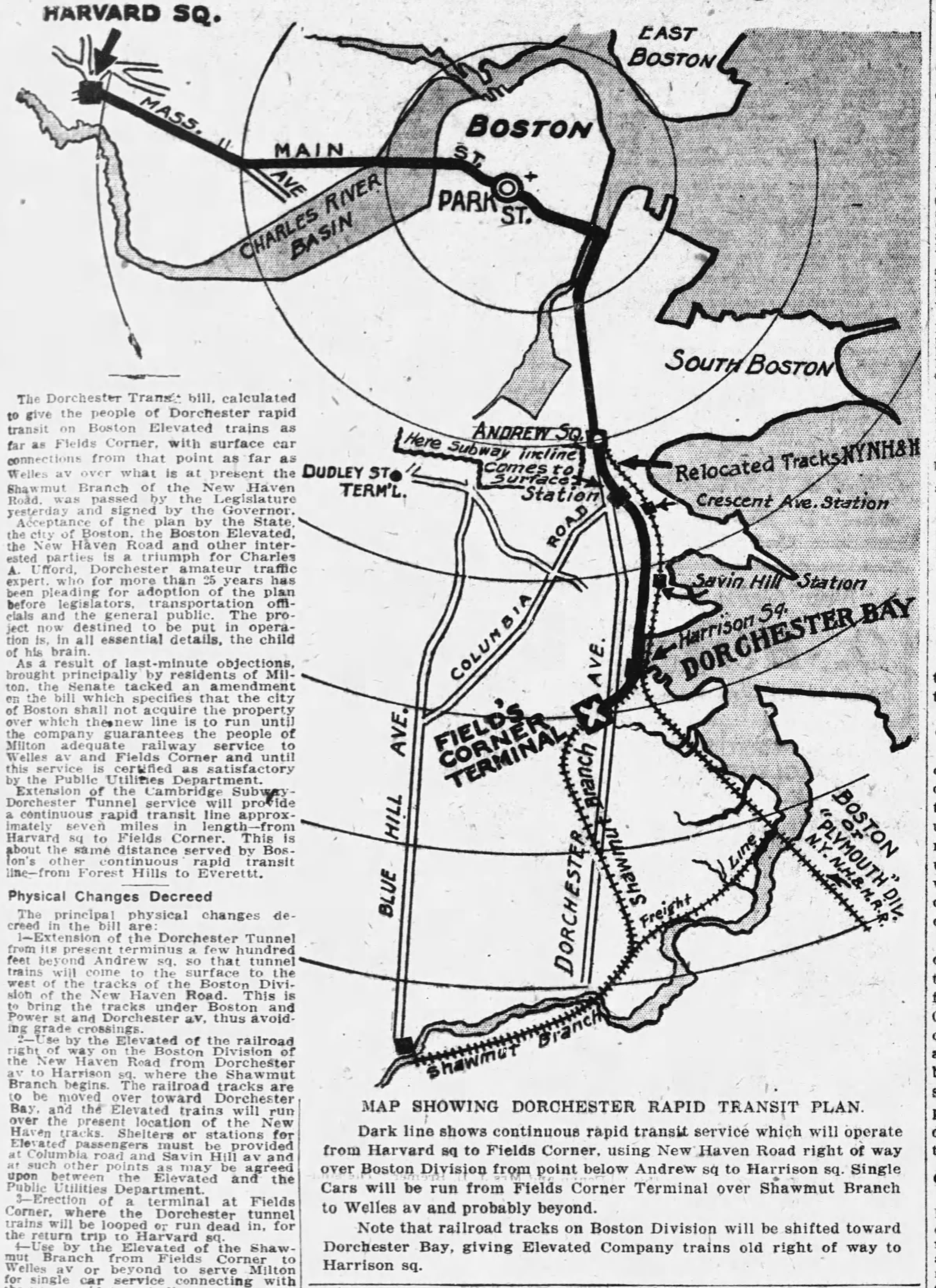
1923 Dorchester Rapid Transit Plan

Ufford was the chief proponent of creating the rapid transit service in Dorchester, Massachusetts in the 1920s. The MBTA service, due to his lobbying, was extended to Fields Corner in Dorchester, giving more service for Milton and Quincy residents. After the legislative failure of his idea that would require bridges to cross over streets, he then proposed an elevated railway rapid transit, and then improved on the idea until the final system was developed.

Upon the 1924 passage of the plan, Boston Mayor James Michael Curley gave Ufford the quill pen used to sign the legislation.

== Stereopticon ==
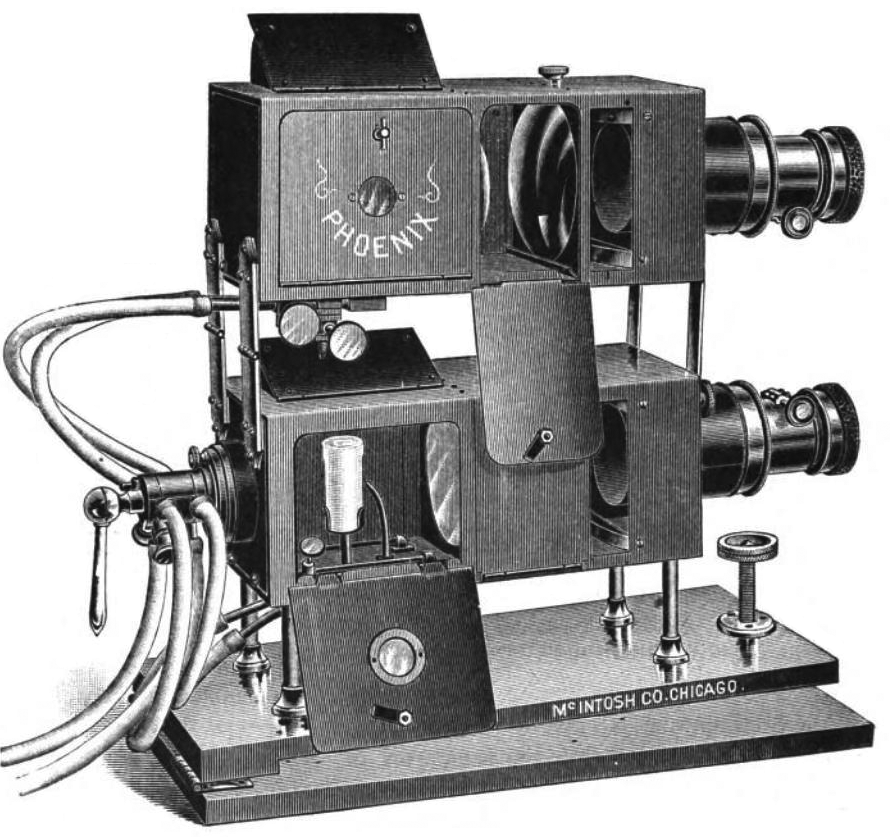
A stereopticon

As a traffic expert he always travelled by street car, attending Massachusetts State House hearings for over 30 years to push for more rapid transit for Dorchester. He used a stereopticon and gave slideshow lectures with it by lantern-light at hearings, meetings, and lectures.

== Sources ==
=== Works cited ===
- "Chas. A. Ufford Died Today". Newspapers.com. Boston Globe. October 9, 1929. p. 8.
- "'Father of Dorchester Tunnel Plan' Dies at 73". New York Times. October 10, 1929. p. 24.
- Wirzbicki, Alan (June 19, 2023). "The Golden Age of transit-building had its challenges, too". Boston Globe.

=== Further reading ===
- "Dorchester Rapid Transit Extension News (1915-1931)". Electric Railway Journal, Various Issues, 1915-1931.
