= Fields Corner =

Historic commercial district in Dorchester, Boston, Massachusetts

Coordinates: 42°18′05.5″N 71°03′35.3″W

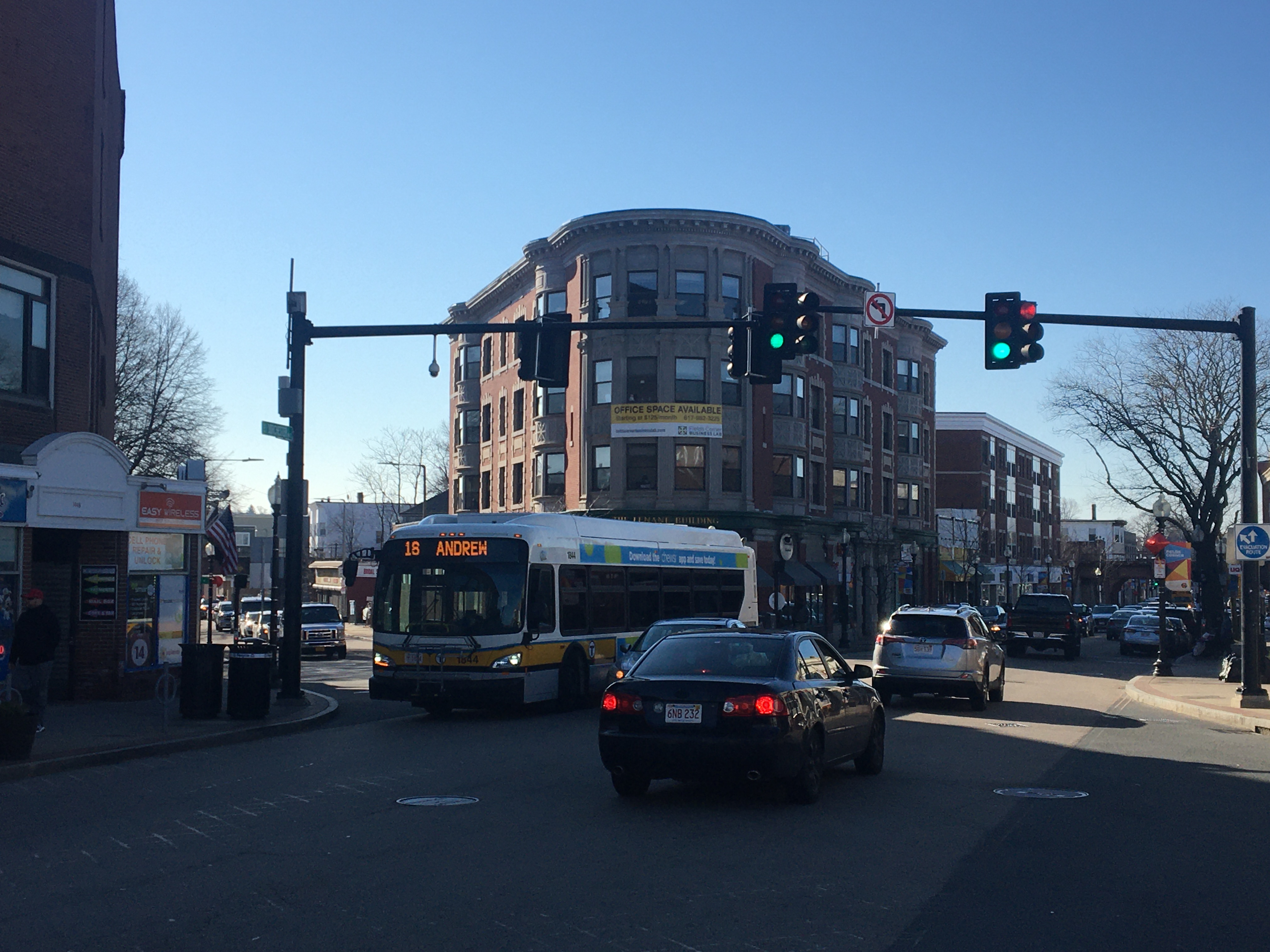
A street intersection in Fields Corner

Fields Corner is a historic commercial district in Dorchester, the largest neighborhood in Boston, Massachusetts, United States founded in June 1630.

== Naming ==
It is named after Zechariah Field (born in East Ardsley in the West Riding of Yorkshire, Eng., about 1600; arrived in Boston, 1629). He was a son of John and grandson of John Field, a distinguished astronomer of England. He lived in Dorchester, 1630. His place of residence is still known as Fields' Corner.

== Geography ==
The area is served by the newly refurbished Fields Corner subway station on the Ashmont branch of the MBTA Red Line. The X-shaped intersection of Adams Street and Dorchester Avenue marks the center of one of Dorchester's busiest commercial districts. The Fields Corner district is distinguished by several landmark buildings, including one of Dorchester's most well-known, One Fields Corner, also known as the Lenane Building or the Liggett Drug Store Building, at 1448-1456 Dorchester Avenue, a triangular building with prominent curved facade dominating the south side of the Adams Street/Dorchester Avenue intersection. On the east side of the intersection is an enormous brick building which houses a U.S. Post Office and is known as the O'Hearn Storage Building, which once housed a music hall and today displays little of its original character as a building designed by noted Dorchester architect Edwin J. Lewis.

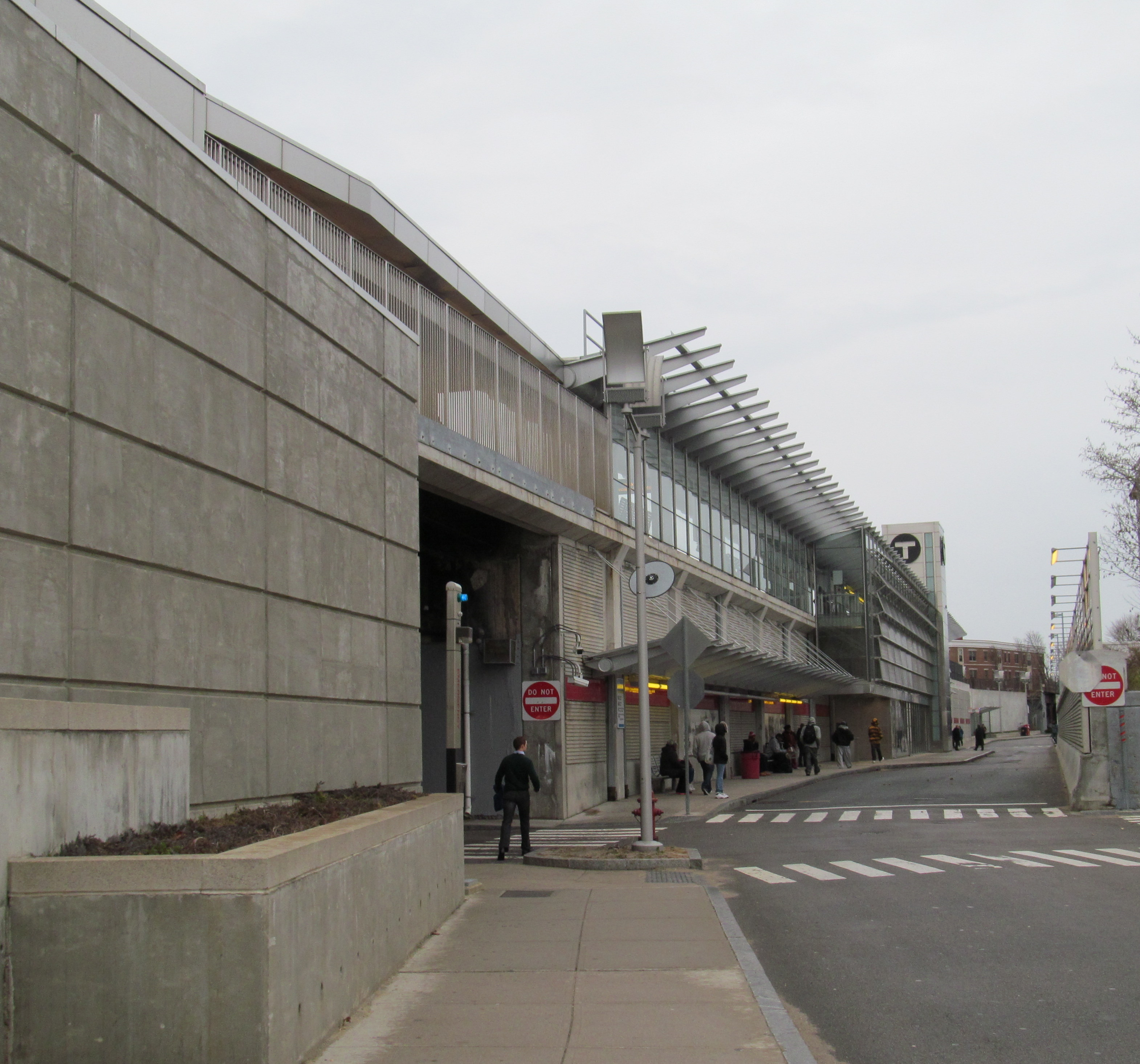
A view from just outside the eponymous Fields Corner train station

To the north is the Fields Corner Municipal Building (1874, now housing professional offices), located at 195 Adams Street on the corner of Arcadia Street, and, a short walk up Adams Street, Ronan Park, an 11-acre hilltop park with a gorgeous view to Dorchester Bay. Residential areas such as Meetinghouse Hill, Clam Point, Melville Park surround the Fields Corner business district and are characterized by densely packed three-decker housing or Victorian homes in yards. Residents are a diverse mix of Vietnamese Americans, Hispanic-speaking peoples, and Americans of African descent, and European descent. Fields Corner is known in Boston for its Vietnamese restaurants serving excellent pho (Vietnamese soup), Dorchester's long-standing Irish population is represented by several pubs, including the Blarney Stone, where it is said draft Guinness was first served in the United States.
