= Andrew station =

Subway station in Boston, Massachusetts, US

Andrew
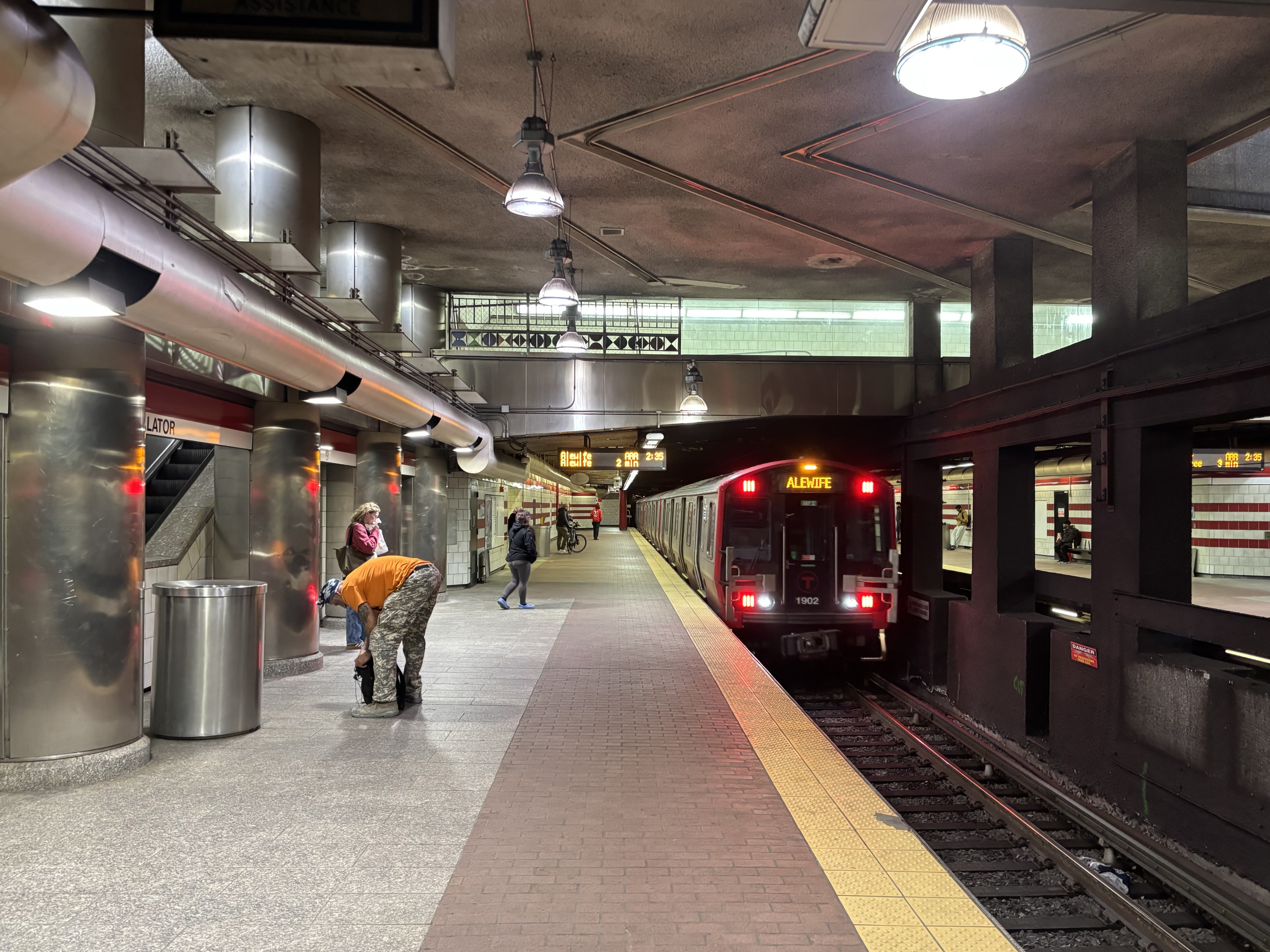
- A northbound train entering Andrew station in October 2025

General information
- Location: Dorchester Avenue at Southampton Street; South Boston, Boston, Massachusetts
- Coordinates: 42.33011°N 71.05724°W
- Line: Dorchester Tunnel
- Platforms: 2 side platforms
- Tracks: 2
- Connections: MBTA bus: CT3, 10, 16, 17, 18, 171

Construction
- Structure type: Underground
- Accessible: Yes

History
- Opened: June 29, 1918
- Rebuilt: 1990–1994

Passengers
- FY2019: 5,721 daily boardings

Services
Preceding station	MBTA	Following station
Broadway toward Alewife	Red Line	JFK/UMass toward Ashmont or Braintree
Location

Andrew station is a rapid transit station in Boston, Massachusetts. Located at Andrew Square in South Boston, it serves the MBTA Red Line and the MBTA bus system. Named for John Albion Andrew, the square is at the intersection of several major thoroughfares: Dorchester Avenue, Dorchester Street, Southampton Street, and Boston Street. Andrew is the primary transfer point between the Red Line subway and the MBTA surface bus routes into South Boston. Opened in 1918 and renovated in 1990–1994, it is fully accessible.

== History ==
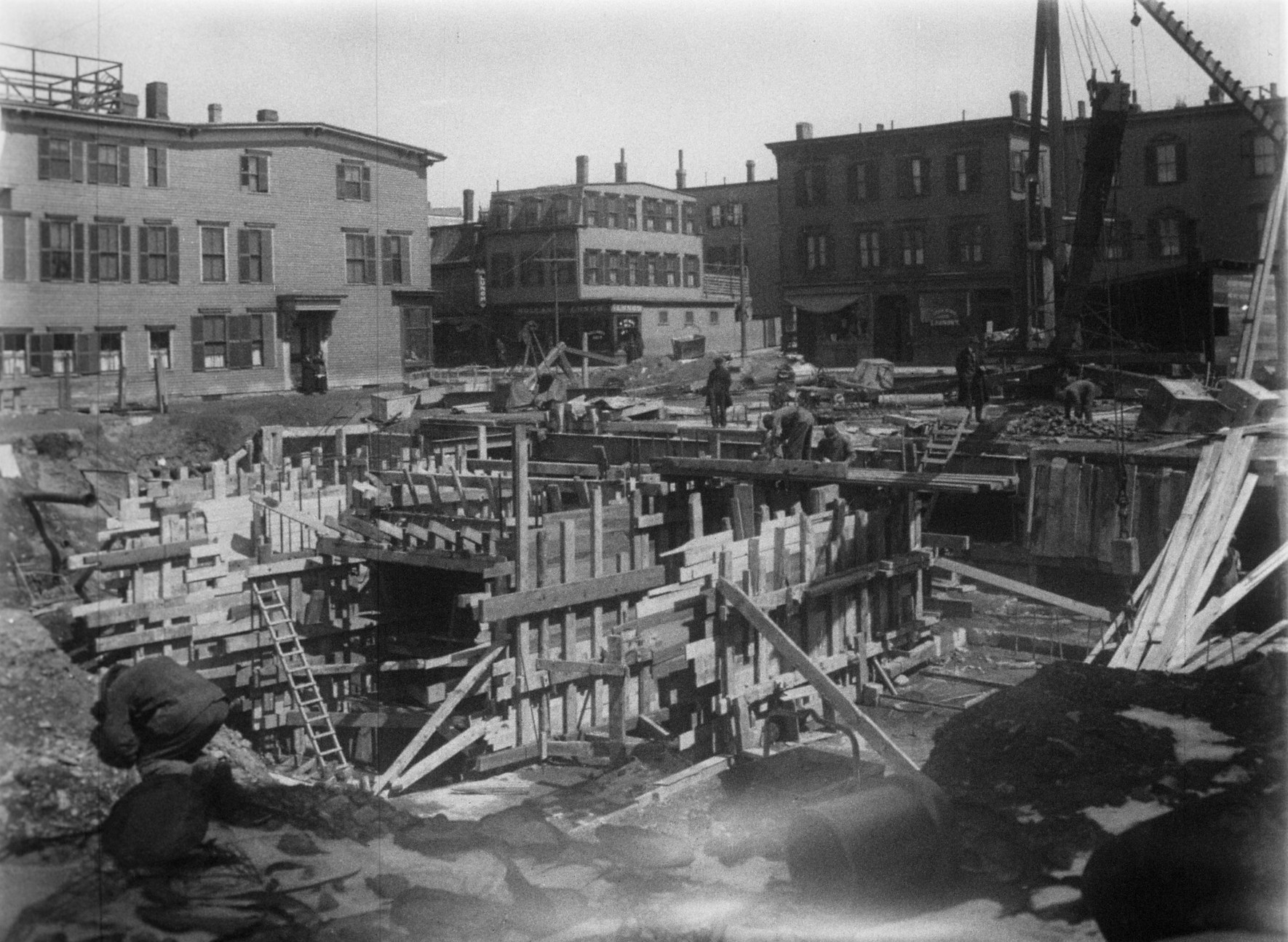
Andrew station under construction in April 1917

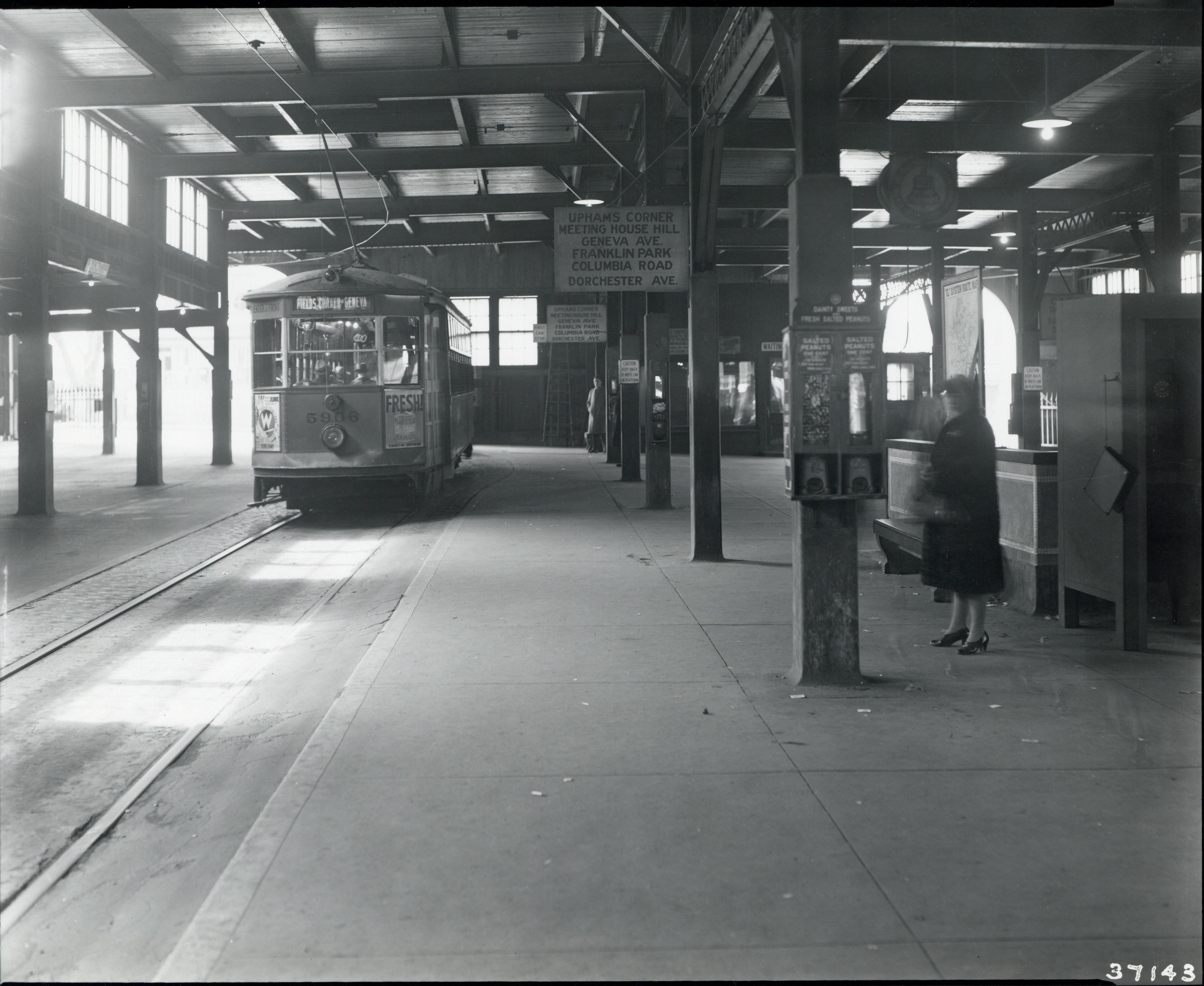
A route 17 trolley at the surface station in the 1940s

The station opened in June 1918 as the southern terminus of the Cambridge–Dorchester line, and quickly replaced Broadway as the primary streetcar transfer point for South Boston. A multiple track streetcar station was built on the surface, with direct connections from the rapid transit platforms. Andrew was the terminus of the line until November 1927, when Columbia, Savin Hill, and Fields Corner stations opened on the Ashmont branch.

The fare mezzanines and staircases were reconfigured over the years as streetcars were replaced by trackless trolleys and later buses. Streetcars and trackless trolleys entered the surface station from Dorchester Avenue, but after bustitution in 1962 the traffic direction was reversed.

From its opening of the South Shore line on September 1, 1971, until the second platform at JFK/UMass opened on December 14, 1988, Andrew was the southernmost transfer point between the Ashmont and South Shore (Braintree) branches of the Red Line. The platforms were extended in the mid-1980s to allow six-car trains, but the station itself was deteriorating.

After political requests and lobbying efforts by the local community, the station underwent extensive renovation from 1990 to 1993 with a new bus shed and underground connections, including a crossover mezzanine between the Red Line platforms. Work began in September 1990; the station was closed nights and some weekends until March 1991 during the heaviest work. Construction on the busway finished in January 1994. The rebuilt station incorporates elevators to the platforms to provide full handicapped accessibility.

The station includes the Andrew Station Time Capsule, a public art installation by Ross Miller, consisting of 14 stainless steel boxes suspended over the tracks, which contain items collected from riders during station renovation in 1993. The boxes are to be opened in 2068, 75 years after their installation. The restored original wood frame toll taker's booth from the 1920s is installed as a permanent display in the inbound-outbound crossover lobby.

Replacement of the three elevators was completed on October 18, 2019.
