= North Quincy station =

Rapid transit station in Quincy, Massachusetts, US

North Quincy
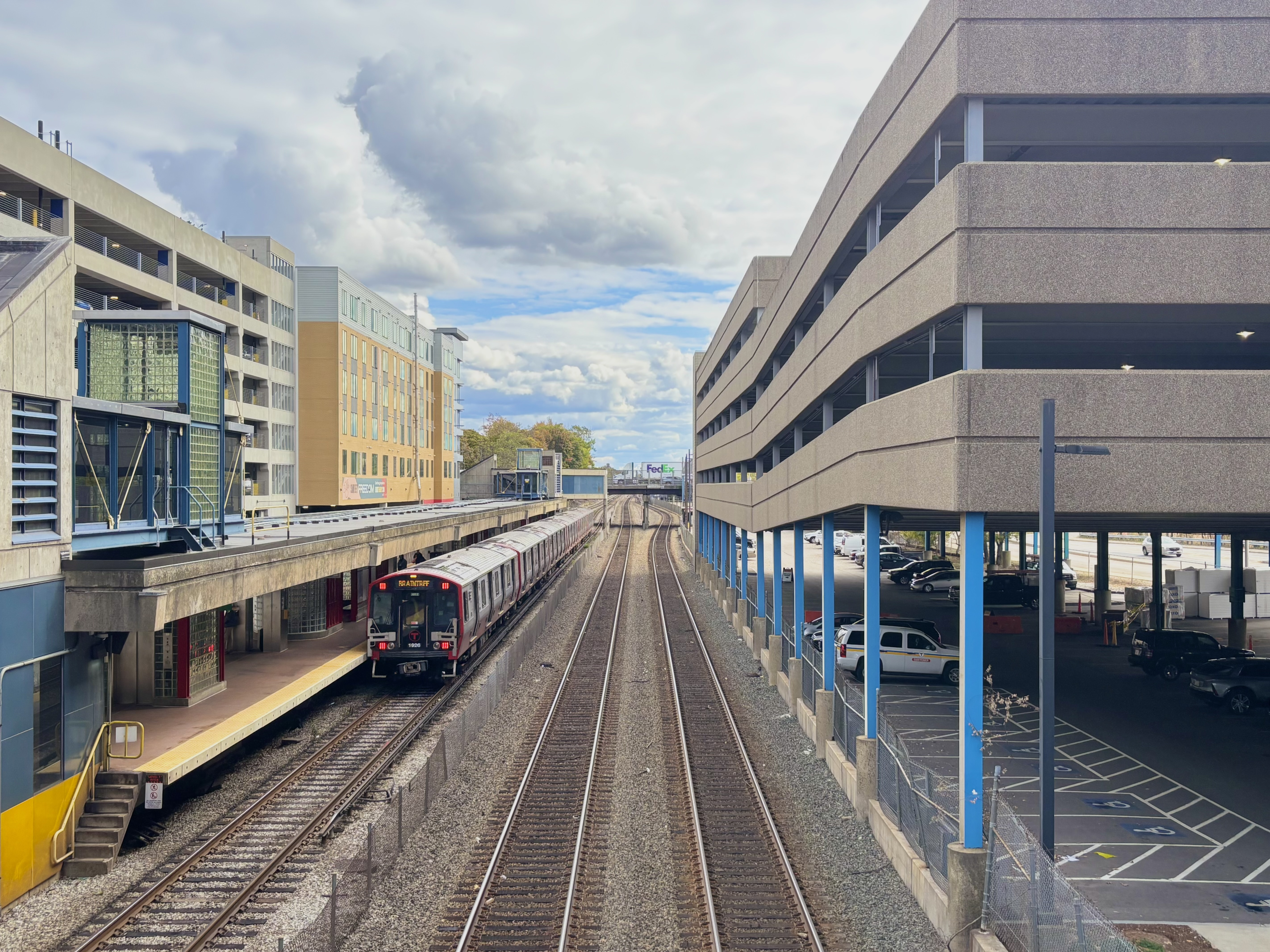
- A southbound train departing North Quincy station in 2025

General information
- Location: Hancock Street at West Squantum Street; Quincy, Massachusetts
- Coordinates: 42.2758°N 71.0302°W
- Line: Braintree Branch
- Platforms: 1 island platform
- Tracks: 2
- Connections: MBTA bus: 210, 211, 217

Construction
- Parking: 1206 spaces ($5.00 daily)
- Cycle facilities: 43 spaces
- Accessible: Yes

History
- Opened: September 1, 1971

Passengers
- FY2019: 8,428 (weekday average boardings)

Services
| Preceding station | MBTA | Following station |
|---|---|---|
| JFK/UMass toward Alewife | Red Line | Wollaston toward Braintree |
Former services
| Preceding station | New York, New Haven and Hartford Railroad | Following station |
Norfolk Downs station
| Neponset toward Boston | Boston–Braintree | Norfolk Downs toward Braintree |
| Neponset toward Boston | Granite Branch Service ended 1940 | Montclair toward Braintree |
Atlantic station
| Atlantic toward Boston | Boston–Braintree | Wollaston toward Braintree |
Location

North Quincy station is a rapid transit station in Quincy, Massachusetts. Located in North Quincy off Hancock Street (Route 3A), it serves the Braintree branch of the MBTA's Red Line. A major park-and-ride stop, it has over 1200 parking spaces for commuters. The station is fully accessible.

It opened in 1971 along with Wollaston and Quincy Center as the first section of the South Shore Line section of the Red Line. It is the only one of the four Red Line stations in Quincy not located at a former Old Colony Railroad station site; the Old Colony served Atlantic and Norfolk Downs stations short distances away.

== Station layout ==
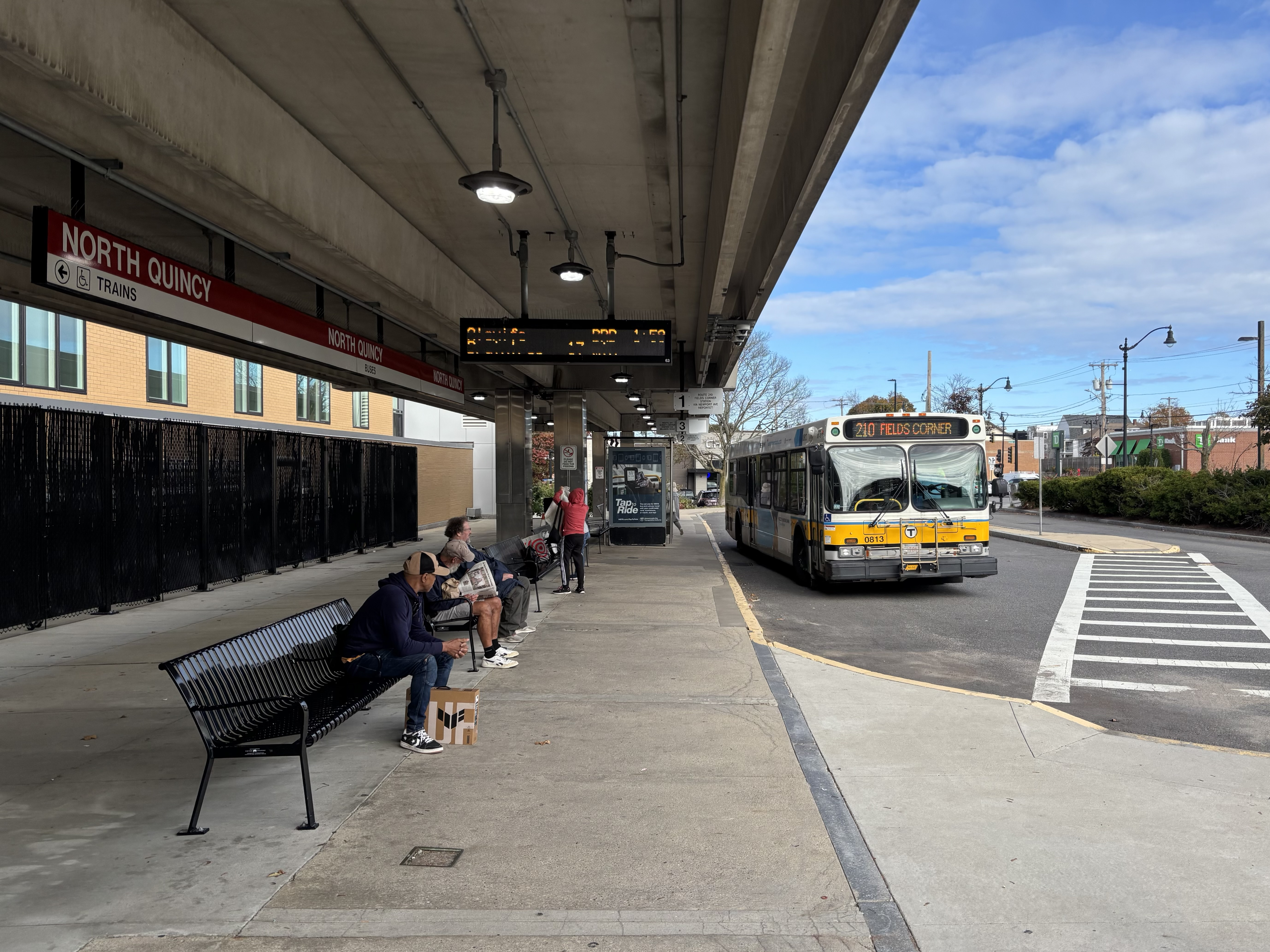
A route 210 bus using the busway in 2025

North Quincy station has a single island platform serving the two tracks of the Red Line. Two tracks carrying the Fall River/New Bedford Line, Kingston Line, and Greenbush Line are adjacent to the west. Parking lots are located on both sides of the tracks. At the south end of the platform, a footbridge connects to the West Squantum Street busway on the east side of the tracks. At the north end of the platform, a footbridge connects to both sides of the tracks.

MBTA bus routes 210, 211, and 217 stop at a busway at the southern (West Squantum Street) end of the station.

== History ==
=== Old Colony Railroad ===
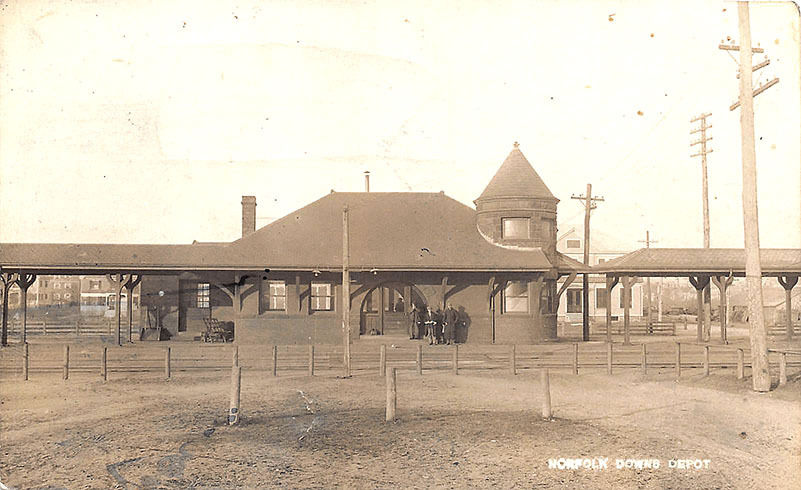
Norfolk Downs station on a 1912 postcard

The Old Colony Railroad opened through Quincy in November 1845. Several local stops were soon added; Squantum Road was open by 1848. The Old Colony built its Gravel Branch from the mainline in northern Quincy west to Montclair in 1848, but abandoned it the next year. By the late 1850s, North Quincy was located at Atlantic Avenue (now Sagamore Street). It was called Atlantic by 1866. In 1871, the Gravel Branch was rebuilt, extended, and connected to the Granite Railway as the Granite Branch. It diverged from the mainline just south of Atlantic station.

The Old Colony Railroad was an early proponent of decorating the grounds of its train stations. By 1891, Atlantic station had a lawn with "Atlantic" written with wintercreeper. New station buildings – low brick structures very similar to the extant building at Norwood Central – were built at Atlantic and Quincy in 1900. The new Atlantic station building was slightly north of the old structure.

The marshland between North Quincy and Wollaston Heights was filled and developed in the late 19th century. Norfolk Downs was built in 1892 as an infill station to serve a residential development of the same name created by Wood, Harmon & Co. Regular service began around April 1892, while the station building was completed later that year. The station was a single-story Romanesque structure built of brick and Longmeadow brownstone, with a round turret at one corner. The waiting room measured 25 by 30 feet (7.6 m × 9.1 m) and was finished with quartered oak. The station was located on the west side of the tracks just south of Broadway (now Holbrook Road), opposite Billings Road. (The Old Colony had left-hand running until 1895, so the building was positioned to serve trains inbound to Boston.) The station cost $10,000 to construct (equivalent to $311,000 in 2024).

Passenger service on the Granite Branch ended in 1940. Ridership on the Old Colony system declined further after World War II, and the New Haven decided to abandon the line in the late 1950s. Emergency subsidies kept the lines open during construction of the Southeast Expressway, but all passenger service to Atlantic, Norfolk Downs and the rest of the former Old Colony system was ended on June 30, 1959.

=== Red Line ===
Even before 1959, discussion was underway to bring rapid transit to the Old Colony mainline. The 1926 Report on Improved Transportation Facilities and 1945–47 Coolidge Commission Report recommended a branch of the Cambridge-Dorchester Line (later renamed as the Red Line) to parallel the Old Colony mainline to Braintree, taking over service on local stops. The newly formed MBTA bought the Old Colony right-of-way from South Boston to South Braintree in 1965. In 1966, the Program for Mass Transportation recommended the extension. The city wanted new stations at both Atlantic and Norfolk Downs, but the MBTA ultimately chose a less expensive plan for a single station. Four sites were considered; a location at the West Squantum Street bridge midway between the former station sites was chosen.

Construction of the station began in 1966, and North Quincy opened along with Wollaston and Quincy Center on September 1, 1971. Shortly after the station opened, the MBTA added a west entrance at the north end to serve the adjacent State Street South office facility. On September 27, 1991, the MBTA was awarded $32 million in federal funds for accessibility renovations at North Quincy, and for a new station at Riverside. The work was combined with clearing a two-track railbed on the west side of the station for the restoration of Old Colony Lines commuter rail service. The northwest entrance was rebuilt to accommodate the new tracks, while the southwest entrance was removed. The elevators were completed in 1998, making the station accessible.

=== Development ===
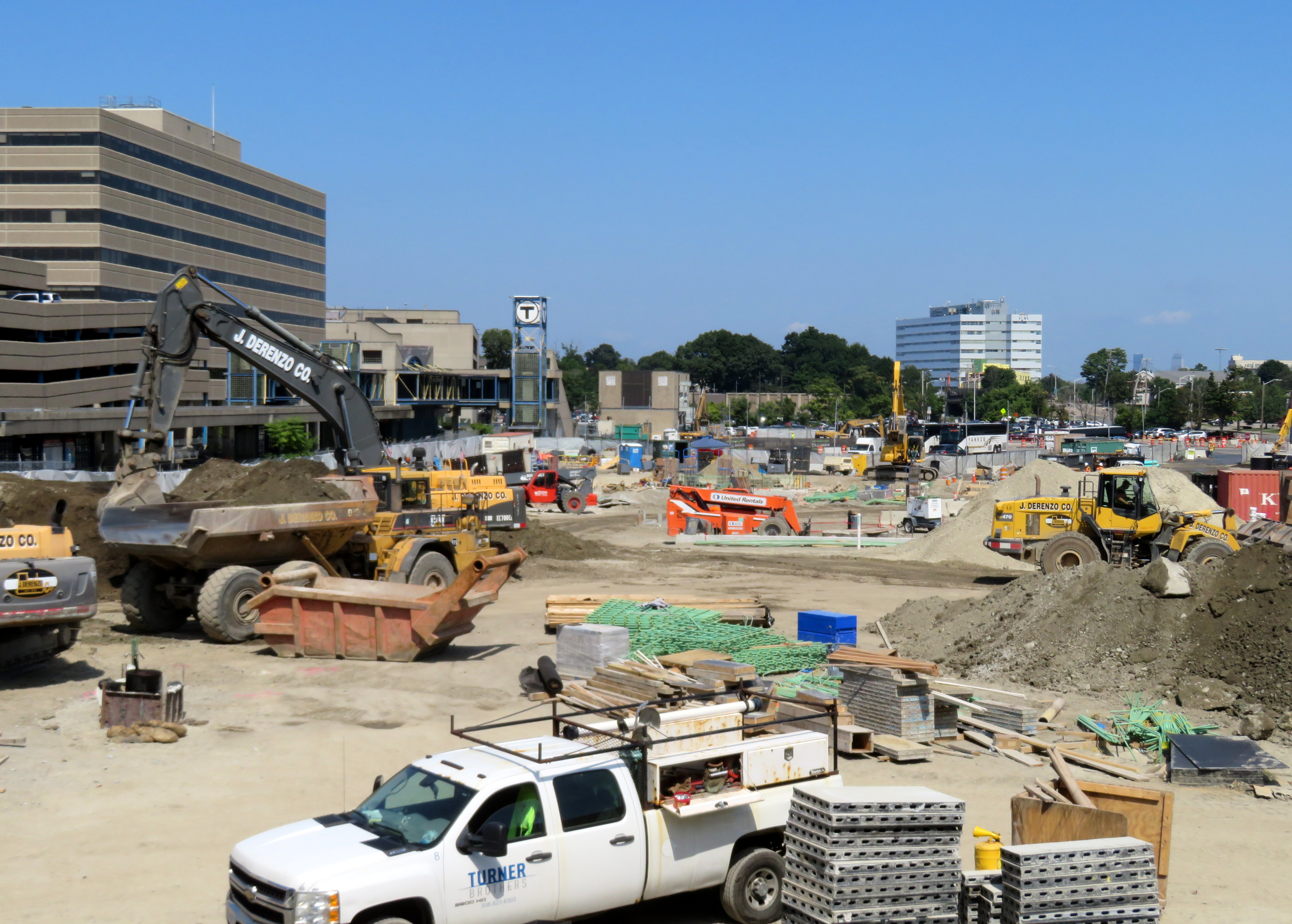
Garage construction in July 2019

An office building and private parking garage were constructed on a parking lot on the west side of the station in 1983. The MBTA and city initially clashed over the agency taking city land by eminent domain; ultimately, the city purchased the air rights from the MBTA for one dollar and surrendered the property. In October 1997, North Quincy was identified as a possible site for a parking garage. The project was cancelled due to concerns over its financial viability.

In February 2016, three bidders submitted proposals for mixed-use transit-oriented development to be built on the Hancock Street lot, with a new garage to replace lost parking spaces. That April, the MBTA board approved a 99-year lease of the lot to a developer. The developer was to build a 1,307-space garage, with 852 spaces reserved for MBTA parking, as part of the project. The Quincy Planning Board approved the project, with the garage increased to 1,600 spaces, in June 2017. Shortly before construction was expected to begin, a local carpenters union petitioned the state to force a public bidding process for the garage because it will be operated by the MBTA. In April 2018, Massachusetts Attorney General Maura Healey ruled that the MBTA or the developers were legally required to publicly bid for the garage construction.

Construction on the garage – the first part of the $205 million development – began on February 17, 2019. The garage was largely complete by mid-2020, but opening of the MBTA portion was delayed due to insufficient lighting. The first parts of the adjacent development, which was branded as The Abby, opened in 2021. The garage ultimately opened on September 15, 2025.
