= Wollaston station =

Rapid transit station in Quincy, Massachusetts, US

Wollaston
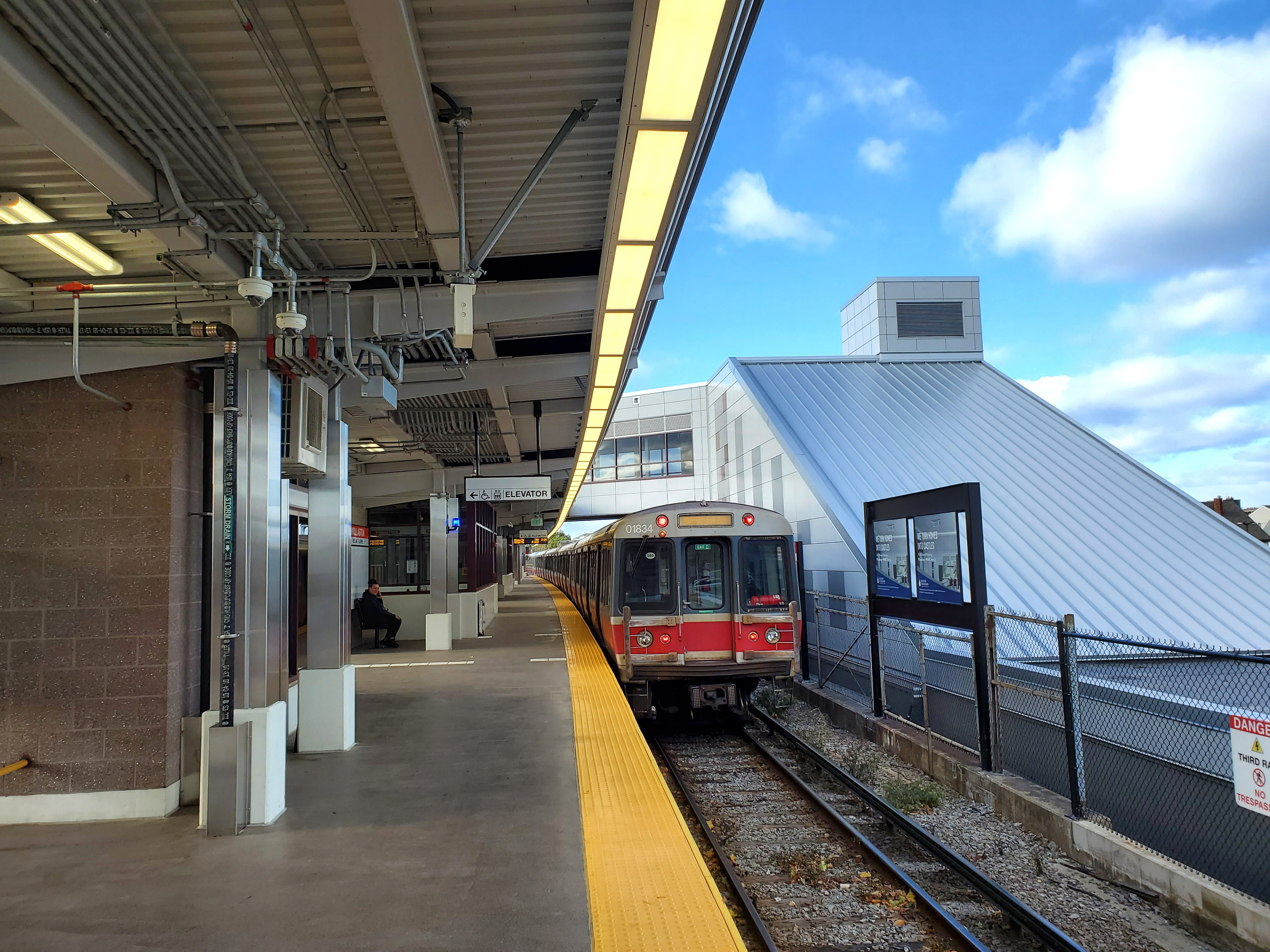
- A northbound train leaving Wollaston station in 2020

General information
- Location: Newport Avenue and Beale Street; Wollaston, Quincy, Massachusetts
- Coordinates: 42.26679°N 71.02050°W
- Line: Braintree Branch
- Platforms: 1 island platform
- Tracks: 2 (Red Line); 1 (Commuter Rail)
- Connections: MBTA bus: 211

Construction
- Structure type: Elevated
- Parking: 550 spaces ($6.00 fee on weekdays)
- Cycle facilities: 88 spaces in "Pedal and Park" bicycle cage ~20 outside spaces
- Accessible: Yes

History
- Opened: November 1845 (original station); September 1, 1971 (rapid transit)
- Closed: June 30, 1959 (original station)
- Rebuilt: January 8, 2018–August 16, 2019
- Former names: Wollaston Heights (former station)

Passengers
- 2013: 4,624 daily boardings

Services
Preceding station	MBTA	Following station
North Quincy toward Alewife	Red Line	Quincy Center toward Braintree
Former services
Preceding station	New York, New Haven and Hartford Railroad	Following station
Norfolk Downs toward Boston	Boston–Braintree	Quincy toward Braintree
Location

Wollaston station is a rapid transit station in Quincy, Massachusetts. Located in the Wollaston neighborhood, it serves the Braintree branch of the MBTA's Red Line. It was opened in September 1971 as the second of three stations in the original South Shore Extension, replacing a mainline rail station which had been located there from 1845 to 1959. Wollaston station was closed from January 8, 2018, to August 16, 2019, for renovations to the station, including flood mitigation and accessibility improvements.

== History ==
=== Old Colony Railroad ===
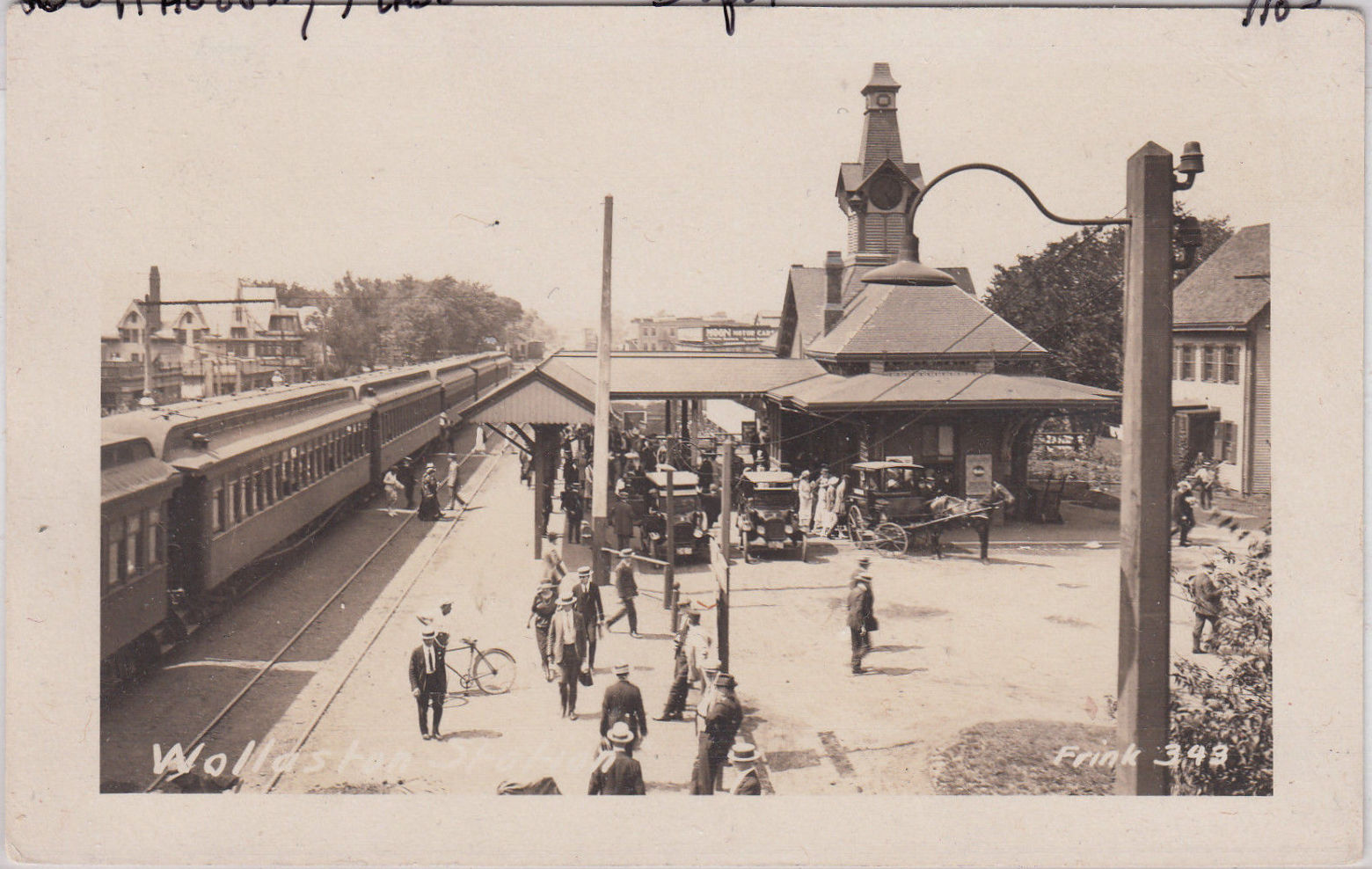
The 1877-built station on an early postcard

The Old Colony Railroad opened through Quincy in November 1845. Several local stations were later added in Quincy, including Wollaston station (also known as Wollaston Heights) at Beale Street. In 1877, a large station with a clock tower was built on the west (inbound) side of the tracks. The Old Colony switched from English-style left-hand running to American-style right-hand running in 1895 after its 1893 acquisition by the New York, New Haven and Hartford Railroad; the depot was moved to the east side of the tracks in 1895.

Passenger service on the Old Colony system declined after World War II, and the New Haven decided to abandon the line in the late 1950s. Emergency subsidies kept the lines open during construction of the Southeast Expressway, but all passenger service to Wollaston and the rest of the former Old Colony system was ended on June 30, 1959.

=== Red Line ===
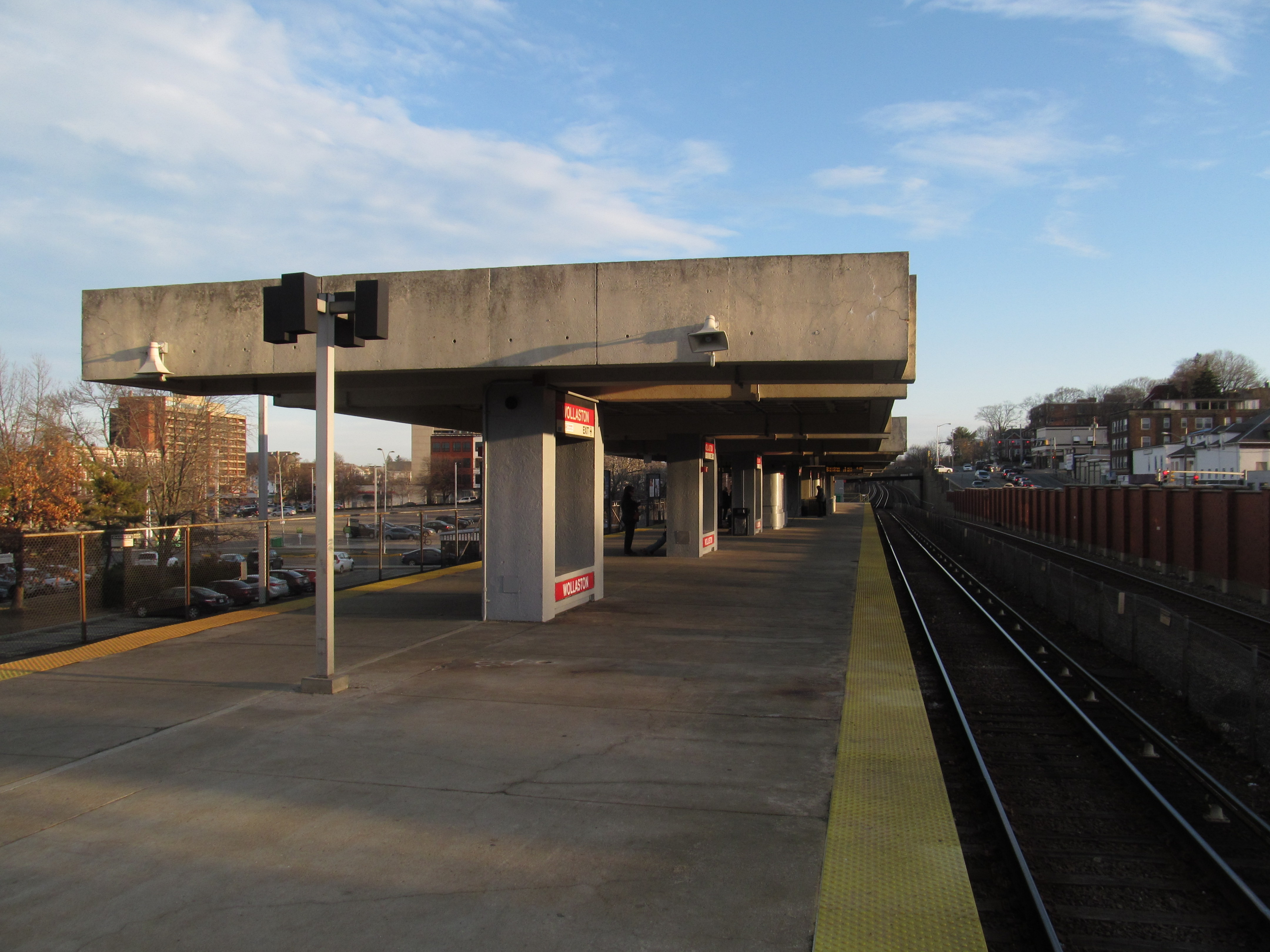
The 1971-built station in 2016

Even before 1959, discussion was underway to bring rapid transit to the Old Colony mainline. The 1926 Report on Improved Transportation Facilities and 1945–47 Coolidge Commission Report recommended a branch of the Cambridge–Dorchester line (later renamed as the Red Line) to parallel the Old Colony mainline to Braintree, taking over service on local stops. The newly formed MBTA bought the Old Colony right-of-way from South Boston to South Braintree in 1965. In 1966, the Program for Mass Transportation recommended the extension, and construction of the station began that year. Wollaston opened along with North Quincy and Quincy Center on September 1, 1971.

The main entrance to the station was via the large parking lot off Beale Avenue. An additional entrance is located on Newport Avenue. The station, located on a high grade, is one of a small number of elevated rapid transit stations remaining in the MBTA system. Although the platform was elevated, the station lobby and faregates were below street level, making the lobby prone to flooding during heavy rainstorms. On July 25, 1988, the lobby was flooded by an afternoon deluge, stranding around 100 riders at the station.

When the station was built, return of commuter service to the right-of-way was considered unlikely and few provisions were made. Only a single non-rapid-transit track for freight service was left on the narrow grade. Commuter service, however, returned on the Old Colony Lines beginning in 1997 and on the Greenbush Line beginning in 2007. Because of the limited width of the elevated grade and right-of-way through densely populated Quincy, adding a second commuter rail track would be extremely difficult. The single-tracked section of the line around Wollaston represents a major bottleneck on the commuter rail system serving the South Shore.

=== Reconstruction ===
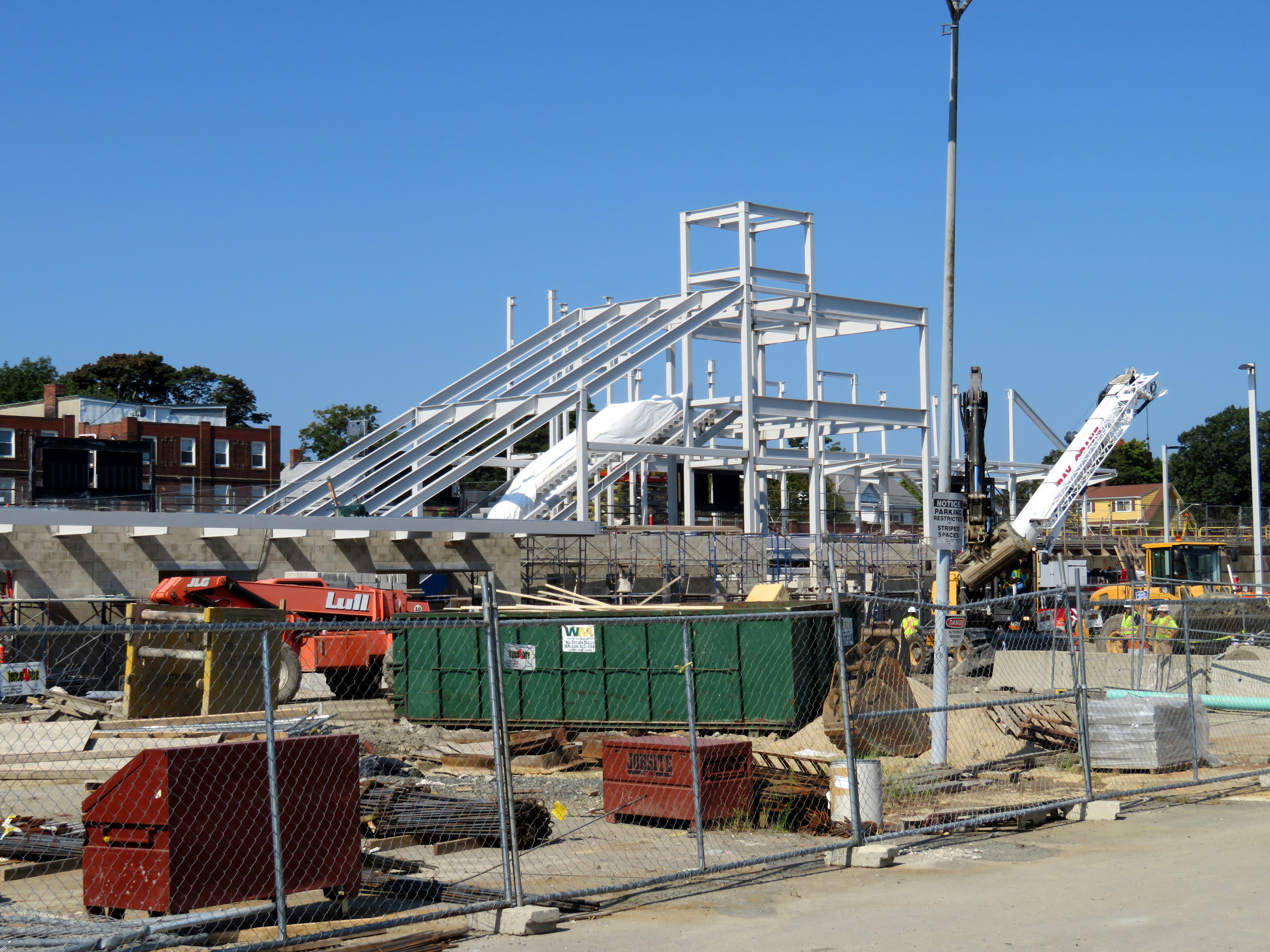
Construction in August 2018

The Red Line's Braintree extension was built before the 1990 Americans with Disabilities Act, and not all of the stations were originally accessible. All other stations on the Red Line were rebuilt or retrofitted for accessibility by the early 2010s. The MBTA planned renovations to Wollaston that would make it handicapped-accessible and solve the flooding problems. Design reached 15% in July 2014, 30% in mid-2015, and 60% in early 2016.

The 30% design planned for accessible headhouses at each end of the station, with pedestrian bridges crossing over the inbound track to connect the headhouses to the platform, but the 60% design revised this to a single larger headhouse. The previous lobby area was to be converted to an accessible passageway between the parking lots and Newport Avenue, with a separate fare payment area and elevator to the platform. 100% design was reached in July 2016. Bidding for the estimated $71.6 million main contract (which included demolition of the closed parking garage at Quincy Center station) took place from April to June 2017; a $67.867 million contract was approved on June 19.

The construction work was originally set to be done from July 2017 to June 2020, and would require the station to be closed for 20 months starting January 8, 2018, with bus shuttles to North Quincy station. The closure was delayed to permit the Wollaston station work to coincide with the start of demolition work at Quincy Center. The station was closed on January 8, 2018, with bus shuttles running between North Quincy and Quincy Center stations via Wollaston. The station reopened on August 16, 2019.
