= Quincy Center station =

Transit station in Quincy, Massachusetts, US

Quincy Center
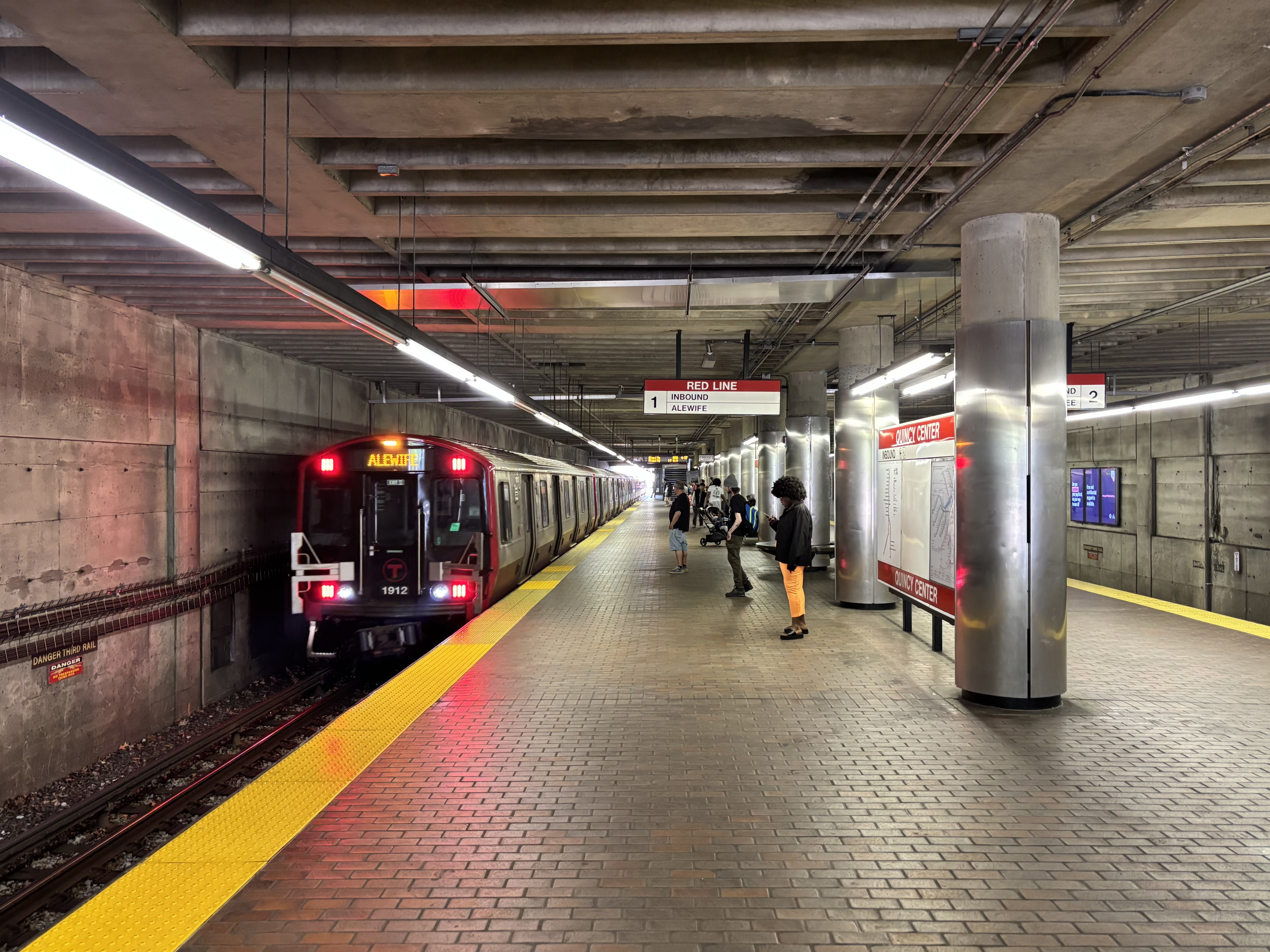
- A northbound Red Line train at Quincy Center station in 2025

General information
- Location: 175 Thomas E. Burgin Parkway; Quincy, Massachusetts
- Coordinates: 42°15′07″N 71°00′20″W
- Lines: Braintree Branch; Middleborough Main Line
- Platforms: 1 side platform (Commuter Rail); 1 island platform (Red Line)
- Tracks: 1 (Commuter Rail); 2 (Red Line)
- Connections: MBTA bus: 210, 211, 215, 216, 217, 220, 222, 225, 230, 236, 238, 245

Construction
- Cycle facilities: 20 spaces
- Accessible: Yes

Other information
- Fare zone: 1 (Commuter Rail)

History
- Opened: September 1, 1971
- Closed: June 30, 1959 (former station)
- Former names: Quincy

Passengers
- FY2019: 7,120 daily boardings (Red Line)
- 2024: 801 daily boardings (Commuter Rail)

Services
Preceding station	MBTA	Following station
Wollaston toward Alewife	Red Line	Quincy Adams toward Braintree
JFK/UMass toward South Station	Fall River/New Bedford Line	Braintree toward Fall River or New Bedford
JFK/UMass toward South Station	Greenbush Line	Weymouth Landing/East Braintree toward Greenbush
JFK/UMass toward South Station	Kingston Line	Braintree toward Kingston
Former services
Preceding station	New York, New Haven and Hartford Railroad	Following station
Wollaston toward Boston	Boston–Braintree	Quincy Adams toward Braintree
Boston Terminus	Boston–Middleborough	Braintree toward Middleborough
Boston Terminus	Boston–Plymouth	Braintree toward Plymouth
Boston Terminus	South Shore Line	Braintree toward Greenbush
Location

Quincy Center station is a Massachusetts Bay Transportation Authority (MBTA) intermodal transit station in Quincy, Massachusetts. It is served by the Braintree branch of the rapid transit Red Line plus the Fall River/New Bedford Line, Greenbush Line, and Kingston Line of the MBTA Commuter Rail system. The station serves as the main MBTA bus terminal for the South Shore region. It is located between Hancock Street and Burgin Parkway in the Quincy Center district. Opened in 1971, the station was covered by a large parking garage which was closed in 2012 due to structural problems and removed several years later. The station is accessible on all modes.

== Station layout ==
Quincy Center station has one island platform serving the two tracks of the Red Line, with a single side platform for the single commuter rail track on the west side of the station.

Quincy Center is the primary terminal for MBTA bus service in Quincy and nearby areas. It is served by twelve routes – 210, 211, 215, 216, 217, 220, 222, 225, 230, 236, 238, and 245 – which use a dedicated busway on the Hancock Street side of the station. Some routes drop off on the Burgin Parkway side.

== History ==
=== Old Colony Railroad ===
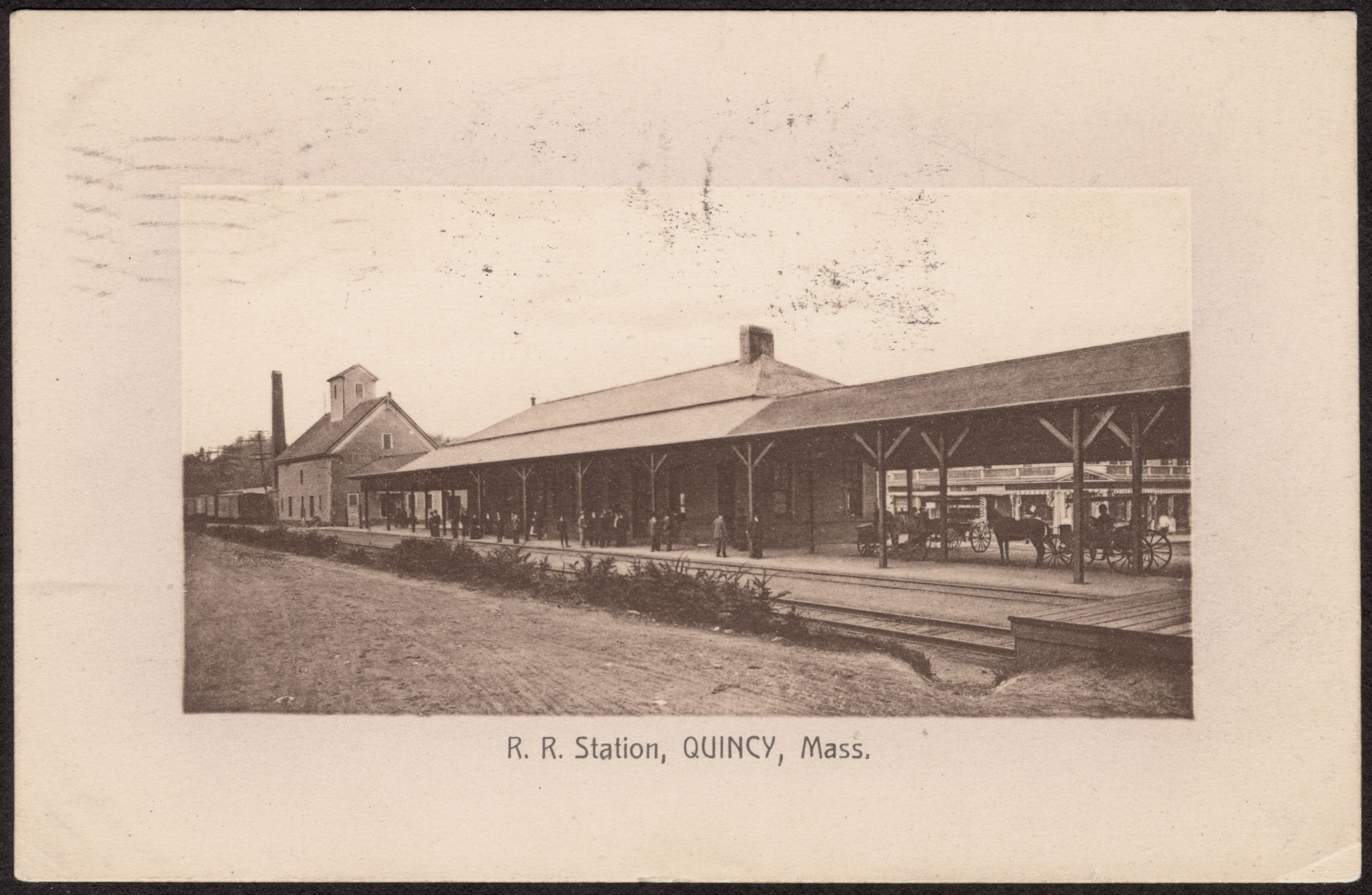
Quincy station around 1910

The Old Colony Railroad opened its main line from South Boston to Plymouth on November 10, 1845. Quincy station was located at Quincy Square behind the town hall. The original station was replaced in late 1868. New station buildings – low brick structures very similar to the extant building at Norwood Central – were built at Quincy and Atlantic in 1900, with shelters serving the line's two tracks. Service on the former Old Colony lines, operated by the New Haven Railroad since 1893, ended on June 30, 1959. The former Quincy station building was demolished in 1967.

=== Red Line ===
The parking garage in 1973

The 1926 Report on Improved Transportation Facilities and 1945–47 Coolidge Commission Report recommended the Cambridge–Dorchester line receive a branch to Braintree along the Old Colony right-of-way. In May 1966, the MBTA began construction on the South Shore Line branch of the Cambridge–Dorchester line (which was renamed the Red Line in 1967). The line was originally intended to be completed to Braintree by May 1969. Although the South Shore Line was planned to extend to Braintree and possibly even to Holbrook or Brockton, it was temporarily terminated at Quincy Center due to disagreements about station locations and other issues.

North Quincy, Wollaston, and Quincy Center stations opened on September 1, 1971. The other two stations had large surface lots, but due to limited land availability, Quincy Center station included a 5-story parking garage located over the two tracks and single island platform, with 600 spots for Red Line riders and 300 spots for local shoppers. The $5.877 million station, located a block north of the Old Colony station site, was designed by Samuel Glaser Associates and built by J.F. White. The station signs included interpretive panels with historical images and information – a design soon copied at other MBTA stations. The new stations required a double fare to be paid on entry and an exit fare upon leaving.

Through the first half of the 20th century, Quincy was served by a number of Eastern Massachusetts Street Railway streetcar and bus lines, with both local routes and through service as far as Providence, Rhode Island. Some routes continued through Quincy to Fields Corner via Hancock Street and Neponset Avenue. After a legal battle, the MBTA acquired the remaining Eastern Mass lines on March 30, 1968. When Quincy Center opened in 1971, most of the Fields Corner routes were cut back to the new terminus.

Further construction began in 1977, and the line was extended to Braintree on March 22, 1980. The exit fare was abolished from Quincy Center north at this time, though Braintree and Quincy Adams had the double fare until 2007.

=== Commuter Rail ===
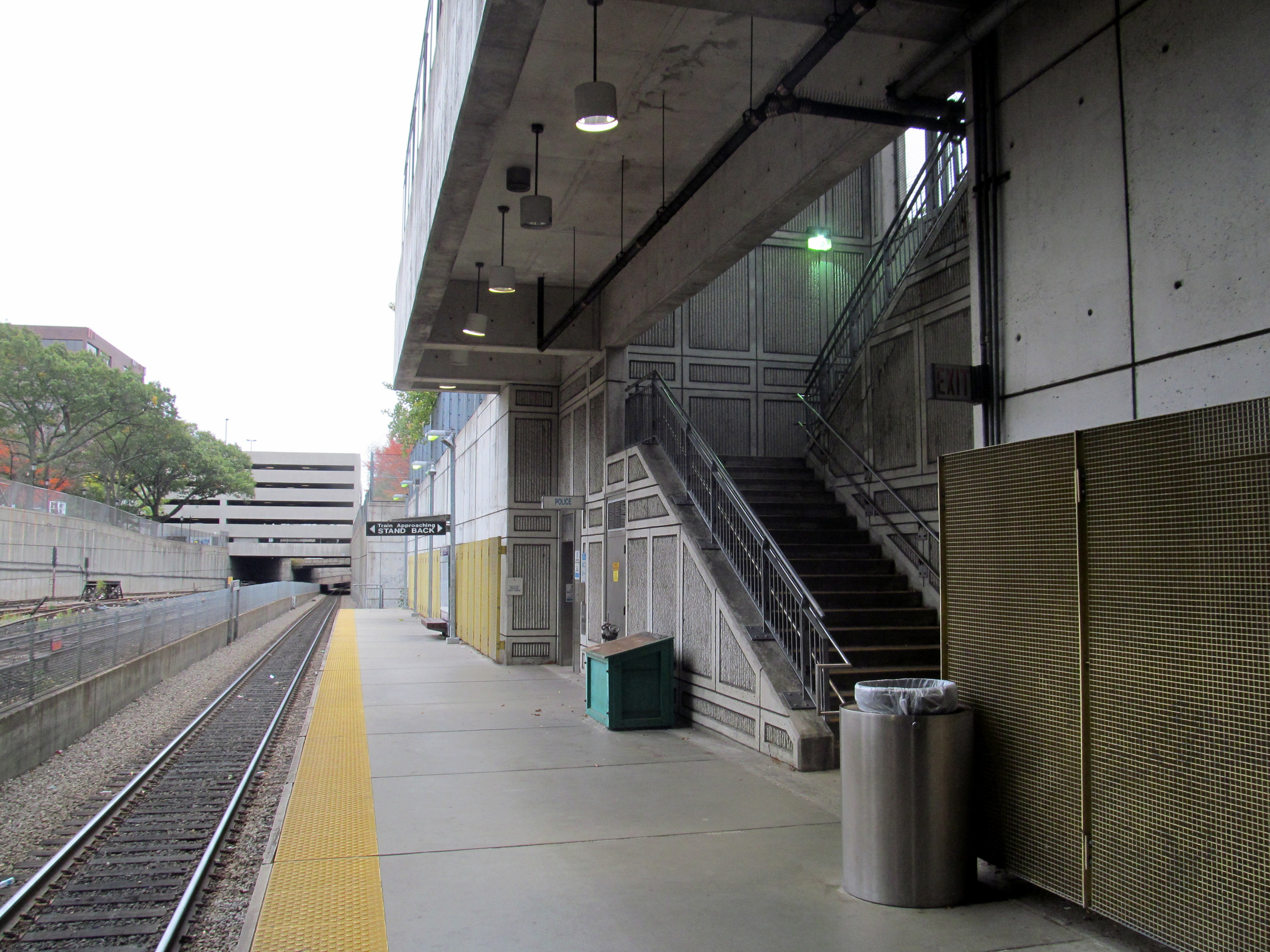
The commuter rail platform in 2015

In November 1987, the MBTA indicated plans to repair the parking garage. In 1991, the MBTA installed two elevators, making the station accessible for the first time.

In 1990, the MBTA began construction on the restoration of parts of the former Old Colony system. A single commuter rail track was built through the west side of the station, with a full-length high-level side platform west of the track. Service began on the Middleborough/Lakeville Line and Plymouth/Kingston Line on September 29, 1997. The Greenbush Line opened on October 31, 2007, with some of its trains stopping at Quincy Center as well.

Some seasonal CapeFLYER trains stopped at Quincy Center in 2013 and 2014, but did not starting with the 2015 season due to schedule changes. In January 2018, Quincy Center was changed from Zone 1 to Zone 1A (with a subway-equivalent fare to South Station on commuter rail trains) as mitigation for the closure of Wollaston station for reconstruction. This continued after Wollaston reopened in 2019, as parking was then limited at North Quincy station due to garage construction. With the North Quincy project near completion, Quincy Center reverted to Zone 1 on July 1, 2021.

=== Garage closure and replacement ===
Garage demolition in 2018

In 2011, the city of Quincy began planning for reconstruction of the station as part of development of the downtown area. On July 4, 2012, the Quincy Center parking garage was closed indefinitely due to structural issues. Built in 1970-71, the garage was the oldest anywhere on the MBTA system at the time. MBTA service to the station continued, though the Burgin Parkway entrance was no longer accessible.

In March 2016, the city released preliminary plans for a replacement structure, paid for by a $970,000 federal grant. Three structures would be built: a new garage with the same number of spaces, a "justice center" with a new Quincy District Court, and an office building for the National Park Service and its bus shuttle to Adams National Historical Park. The garage would have street-level retail locations. The busways would be relocated to the Burgin Parkway side and a roof added; the kiss-and-ride dropoff lane would remain on the Hancock Street side. The project was estimated to cost $52 million; the city proposed to use $10 million in state money approved in 2014, $20 million in federal grants, and $22 million from a private partner who would operate the facility for several decades.

In July and August 2016, bracing was installed in the closed garage to stabilize it while the new structure was designed. In September 2016, the USDOT granted $4.2 million for planning the new station. In October 2016, Quincy mayor Thomas Koch announced that the courthouse part of the proposal would be withdrawn due to local opposition and a lack of available state funds, but planning for the station and office building would continue. In December 2017, the MBTA approved a development plan that was to open in three phases from 2023 to 2031. By early 2019, no further plans had been finalized.

The MBTA proceeded separately with demolition of the closed garage. This included removal of the second through fifth levels of the garage, construction of an accessible ramp to Burgin Parkway, and replacement of the Red Line elevator. A $67.9 million contract, which also included the full renovation of Wollaston station, was approved on June 19, 2017. Demolition work on the garage began in April 2018, followed by elevator replacement that August. Work was completed by May 2019 except for waterproofing of the remaining garage structure.
