= List of MBTA bus routes =

Geographic map of MBTA bus service in 2016

The Massachusetts Bay Transportation Authority bus division operates 150 bus routes in the Boston, Massachusetts metropolitan area. All routes connect to MBTA subway, MBTA Commuter Rail, and/or other MBTA bus services. Many routes are descendants of the streetcar routes of the Boston Elevated Railway, or of suburban companies including the Eastern Massachusetts Street Railway and Middlesex and Boston Street Railway. The MBTA directly operates 146 routes, while private companies operate four routes under contract. Three additional suburban operations are partially funded by the MBTA.

Most buses charge local bus fare ($1.70 one-way as of 2024). The Silver Line waterfront services (SL1, SL2, SL3, and SLW) charge the standard subway fare ($2.40 one-way as of 2024). Express buses have a local portion within a community (which charge the local bus fare), and an express portion that takes a highway to or from downtown Boston (which charges a higher fare of $4.25 as of 2025).

A number of routes were temporarily suspended or placed on modified routings during the COVID-19 pandemic; overall service levels were restored to pre-COVID levels in 2021, though some routes were not restored. Since 2018, the MBTA has been planning a major bus network overhaul, with implementation expected to be complete in 2028. The first changes took place in December 2024.

== Silver Line ==
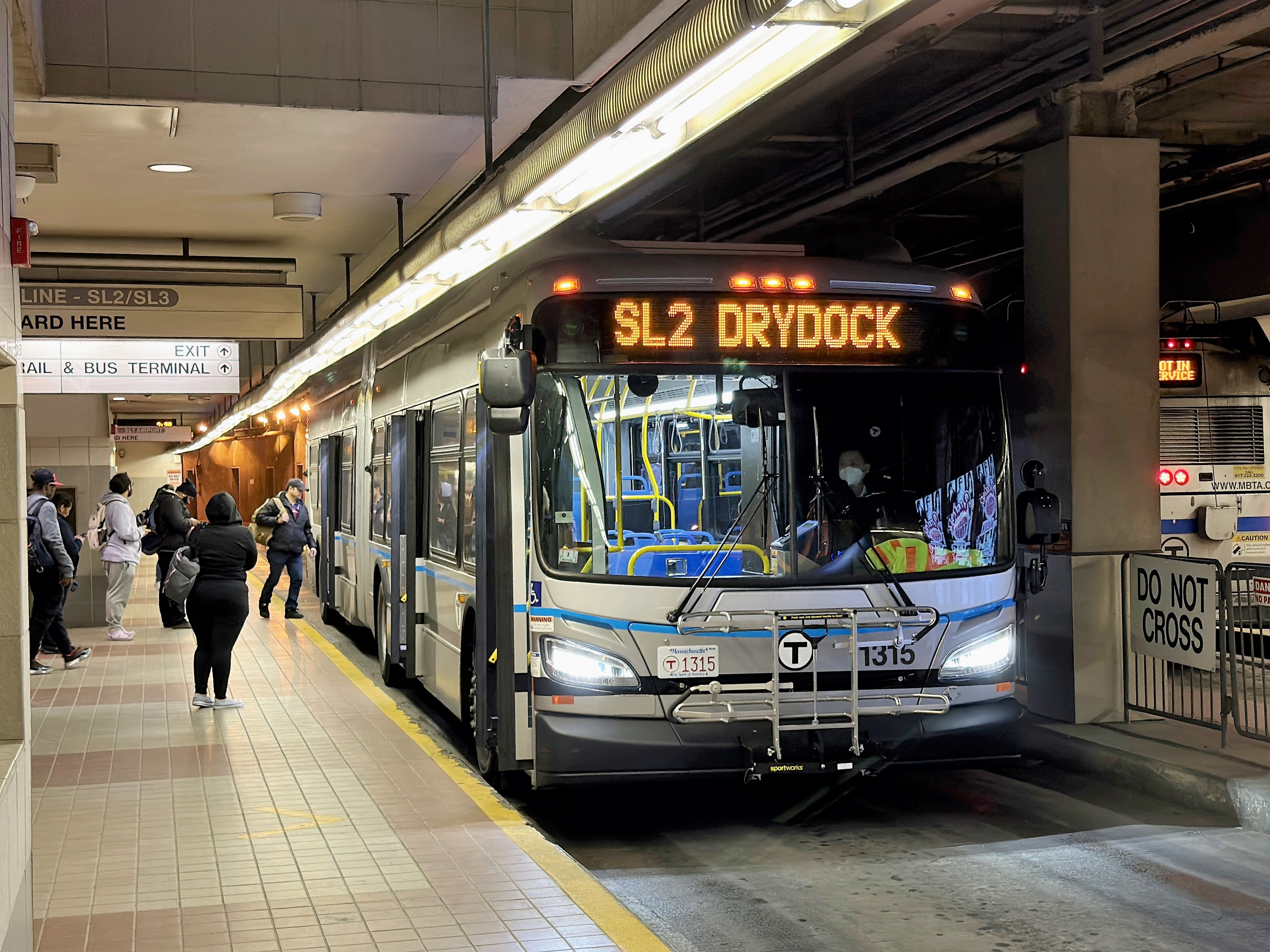
SL2 bus at South Station

The Silver Line is a six-route bus rapid transit system marketed as rapid transit. It is divided into two branches: Waterfront service (SL1, SL2, SL3, and the rush-hour SLW shuttle) that runs through the South Boston Transitway tunnel, and Washington Street service (SL4 and SL5) that runs on the surface via Washington Street. The Waterfront service costs the same as a subway fare, while the Washington Street service costs a regular bus fare. All Silver Line routes use articulated 60-foot (18 m) buses; the Waterfront routes use hybrid buses with extended battery range for electric operation in the tunnel.

The SL5 route was created in 2002 as a replacement for the Washington Street Elevated. The Shuttle route began operations in 2004, followed by the SL2 and SL3 (former) in 2004 and SL1 in 2005 when dual-mode buses became available. The SL4 was introduced in 2009 as a replacement for the canceled Phase III tunnel. A new SL3 route to Chelsea opened in 2018.

Route	Description	MBTA link
SL1	Logan Airport terminals–South Station	Link
SL2	Drydock Avenue–South Station	Link
SL3	Chelsea–South Station	Link
SLW	Silver Line Way–South Station	Link
SL4	Nubian station–South Station	Link
SL5	Nubian station–Downtown Crossing (Temple Place)	Link

== Crosstown ==
One crosstown (CT) route provides limited-stop service that connects major subway and bus transfer points. Three crosstown routes were created by the MBTA in 1994. Route CT1 was merged with route 1 in 2019; route CT2 was replaced by a reworked route 85 in 2026.

Route	Description	MBTA link
CT3	Beth Israel Deaconess Hospital–Andrew station	Link

== 1–121 ==
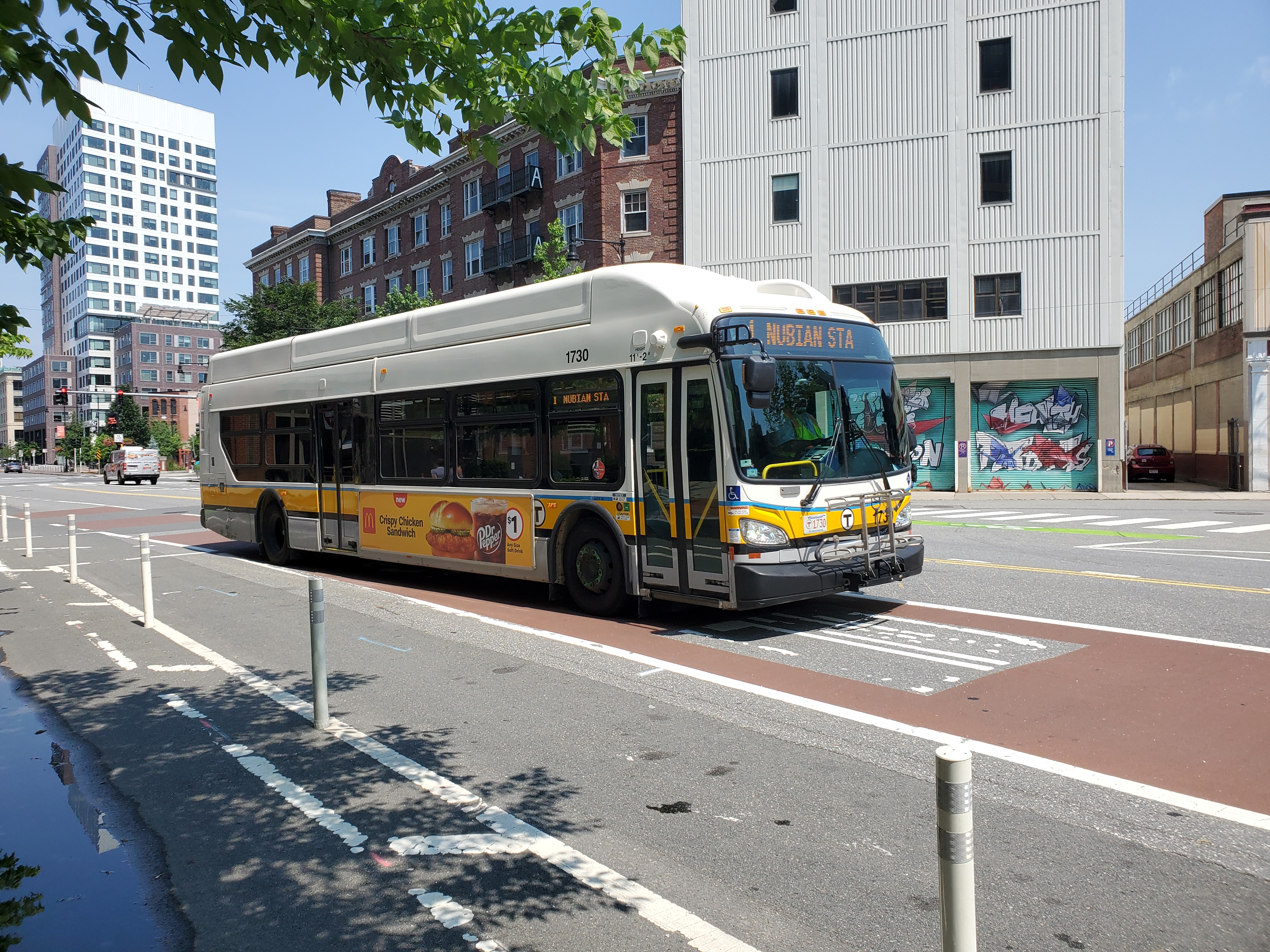
A route 1 bus in Cambridge

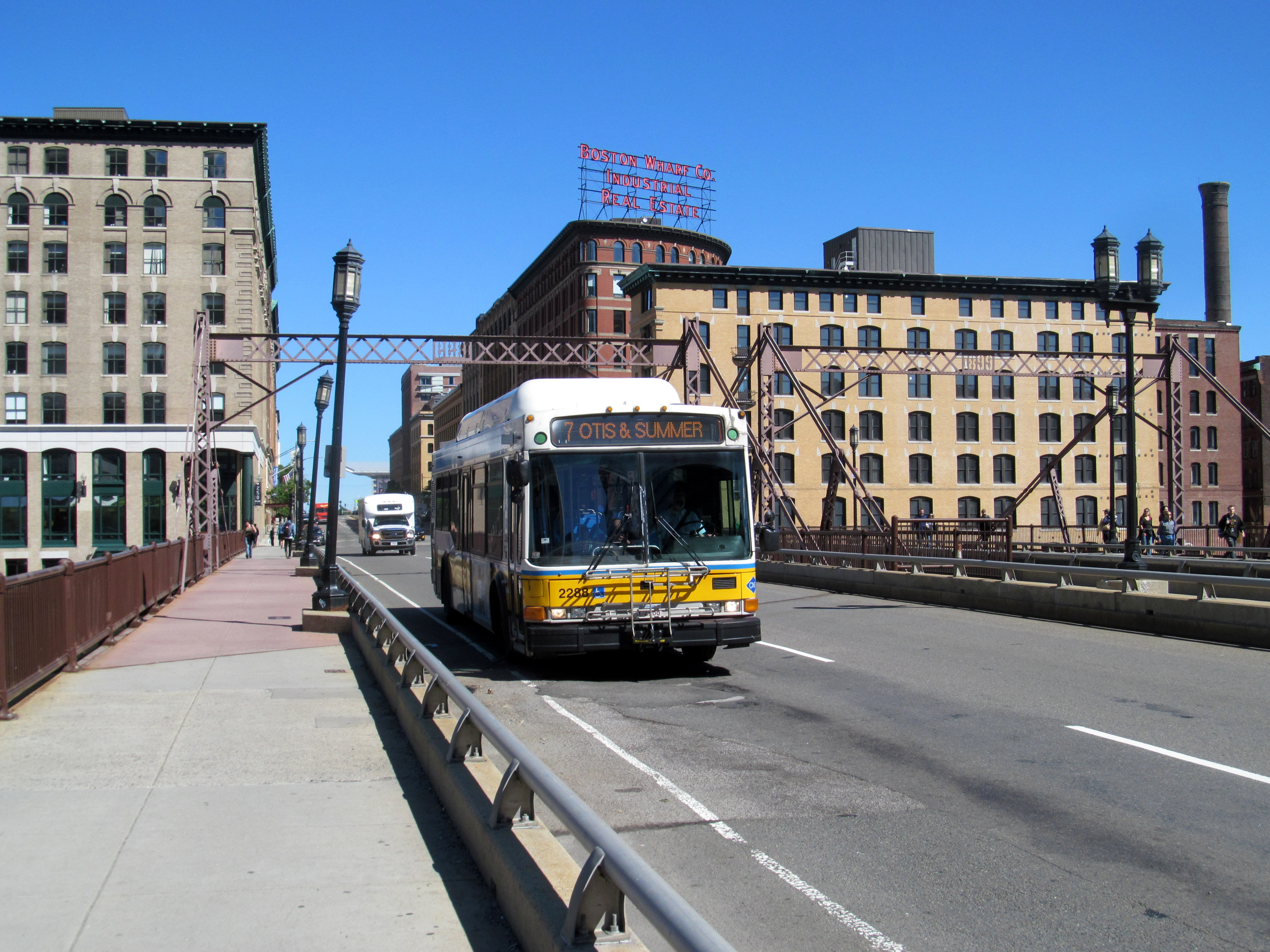
A route 7 bus in Boston's Fort Point district

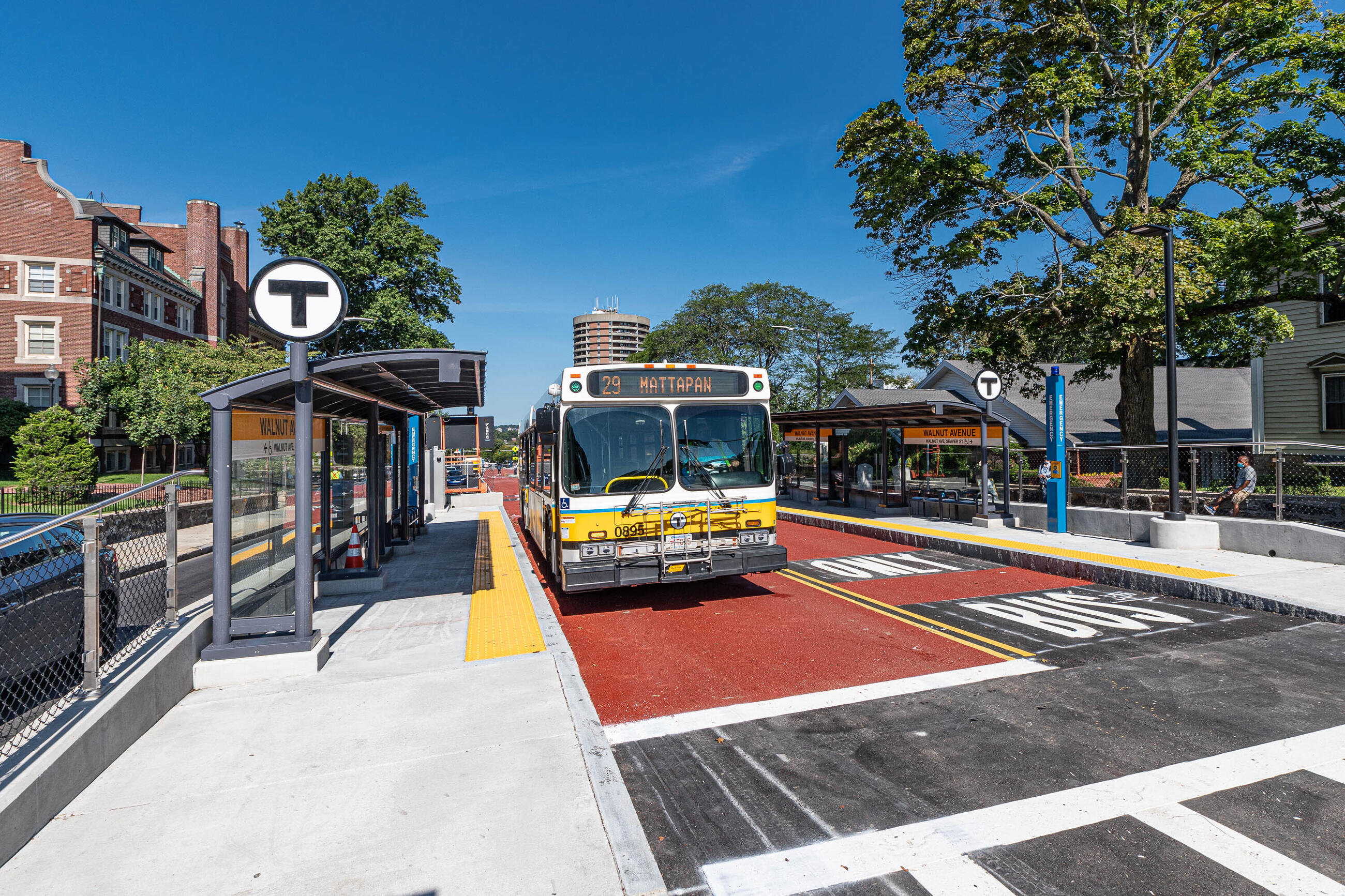
A route 29 bus on Columbus Avenue in Roxbury, Boston

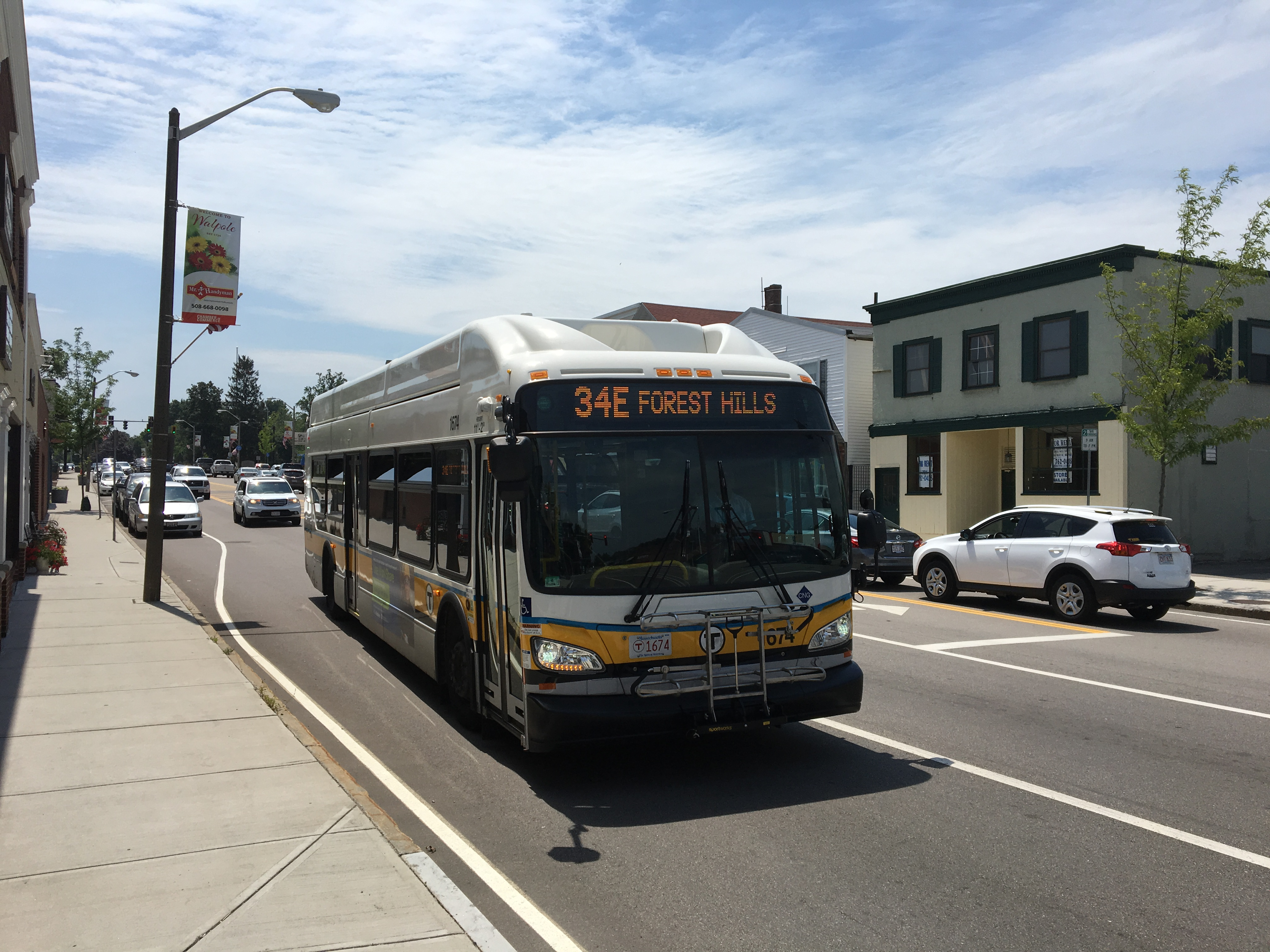
A route 34E bus in Walpole

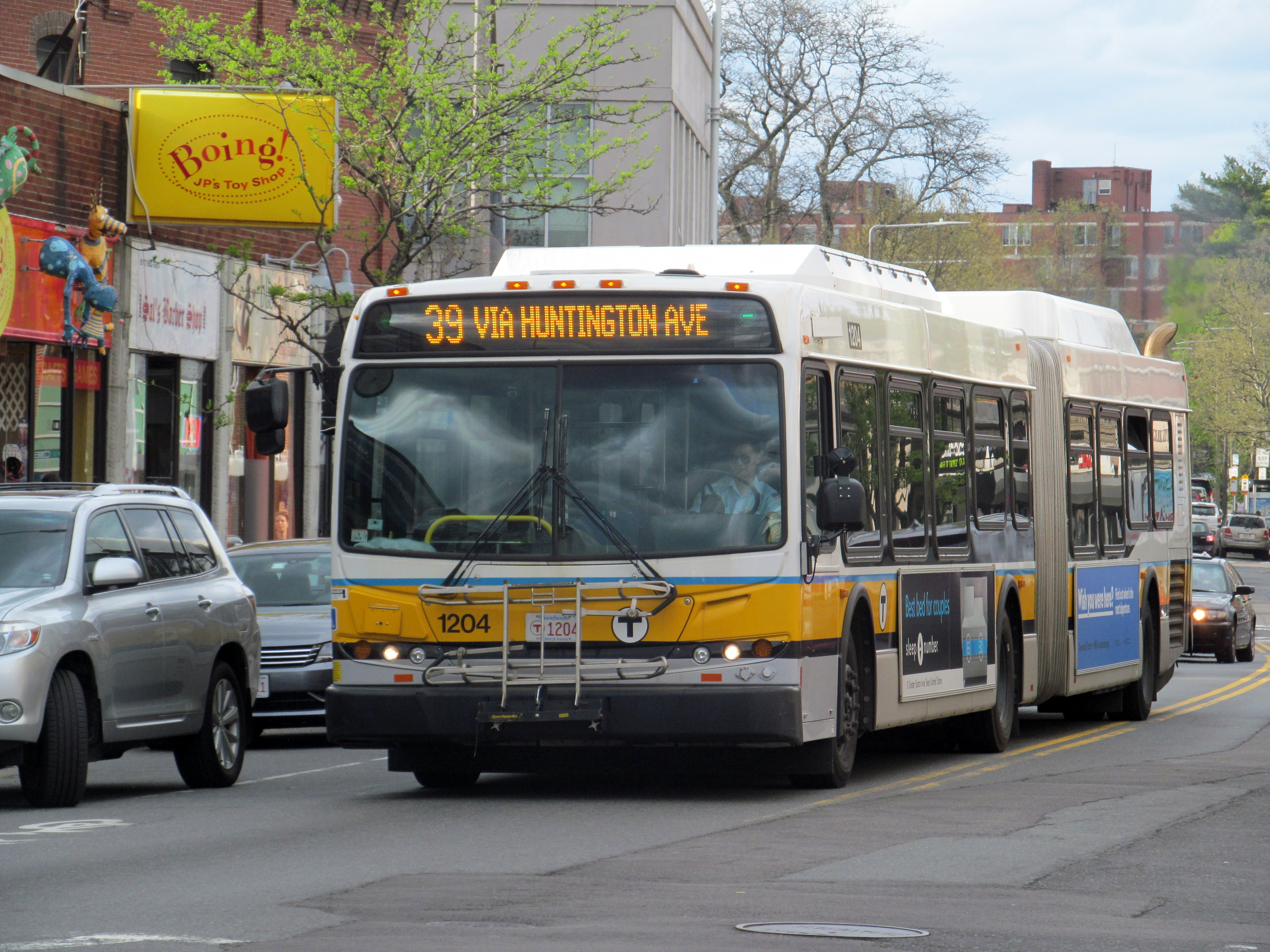
A route 39 bus in Jamaica Plain

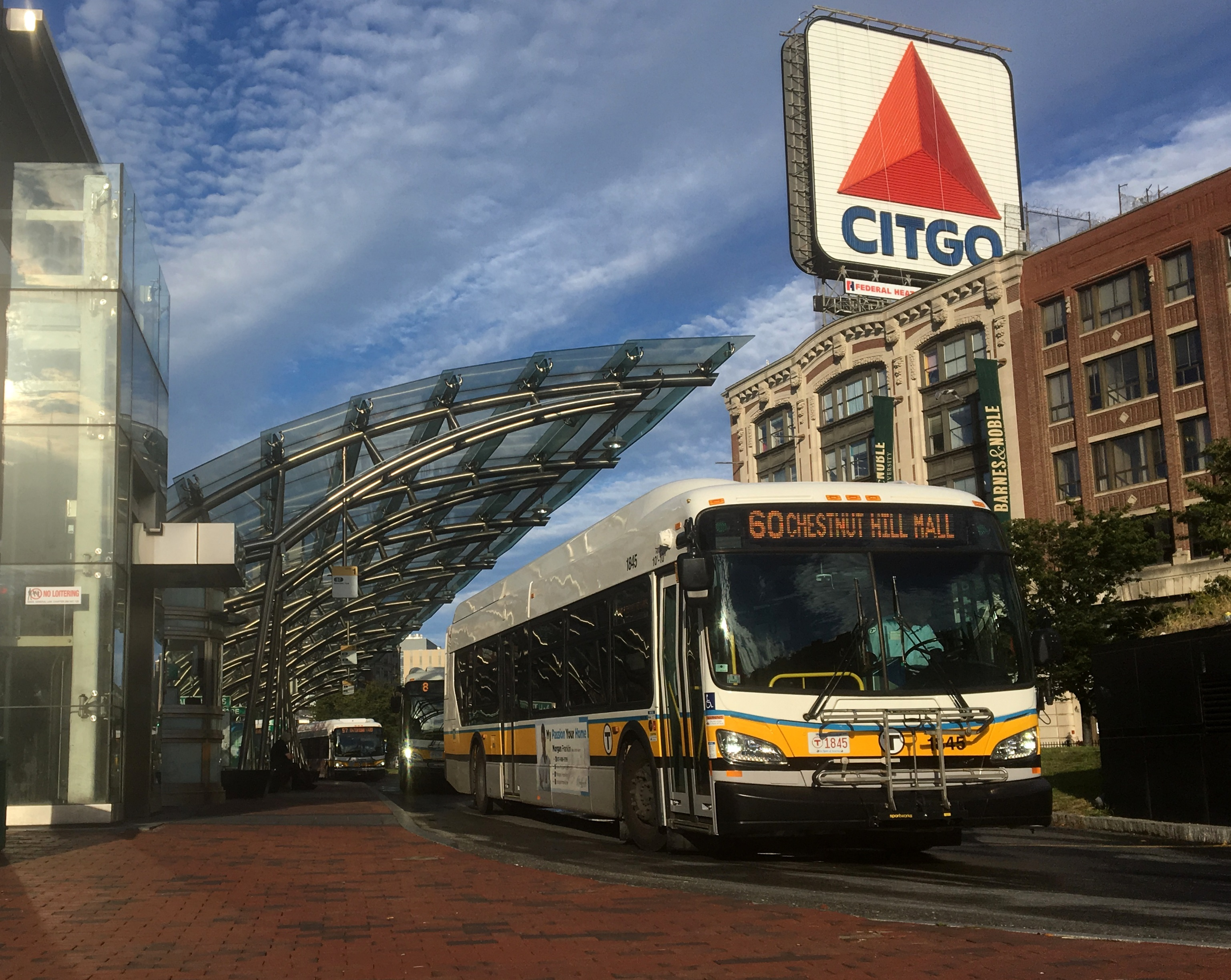
A route 60 bus at Kenmore station

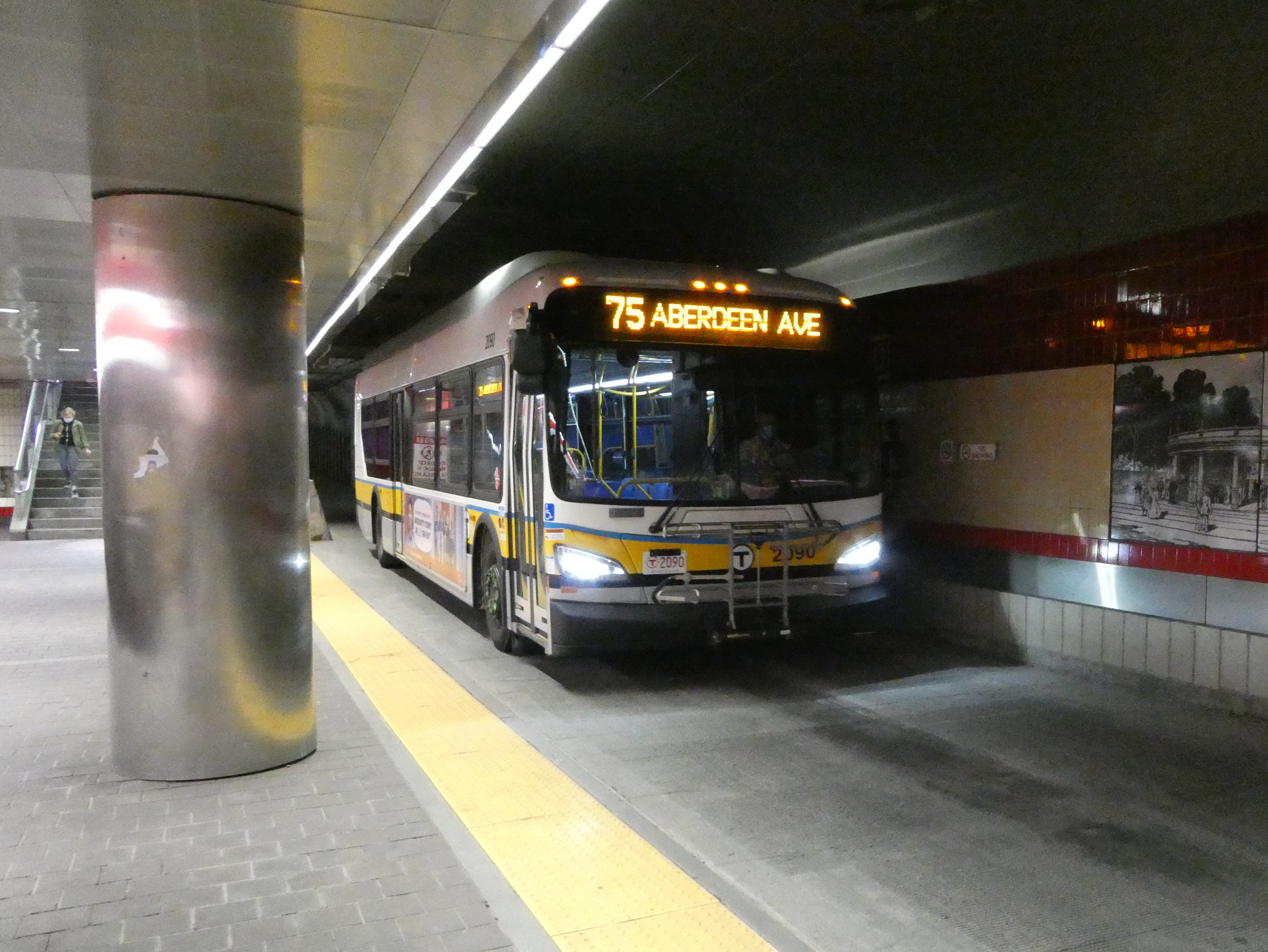
A route 75 bus in the Harvard Bus Tunnel

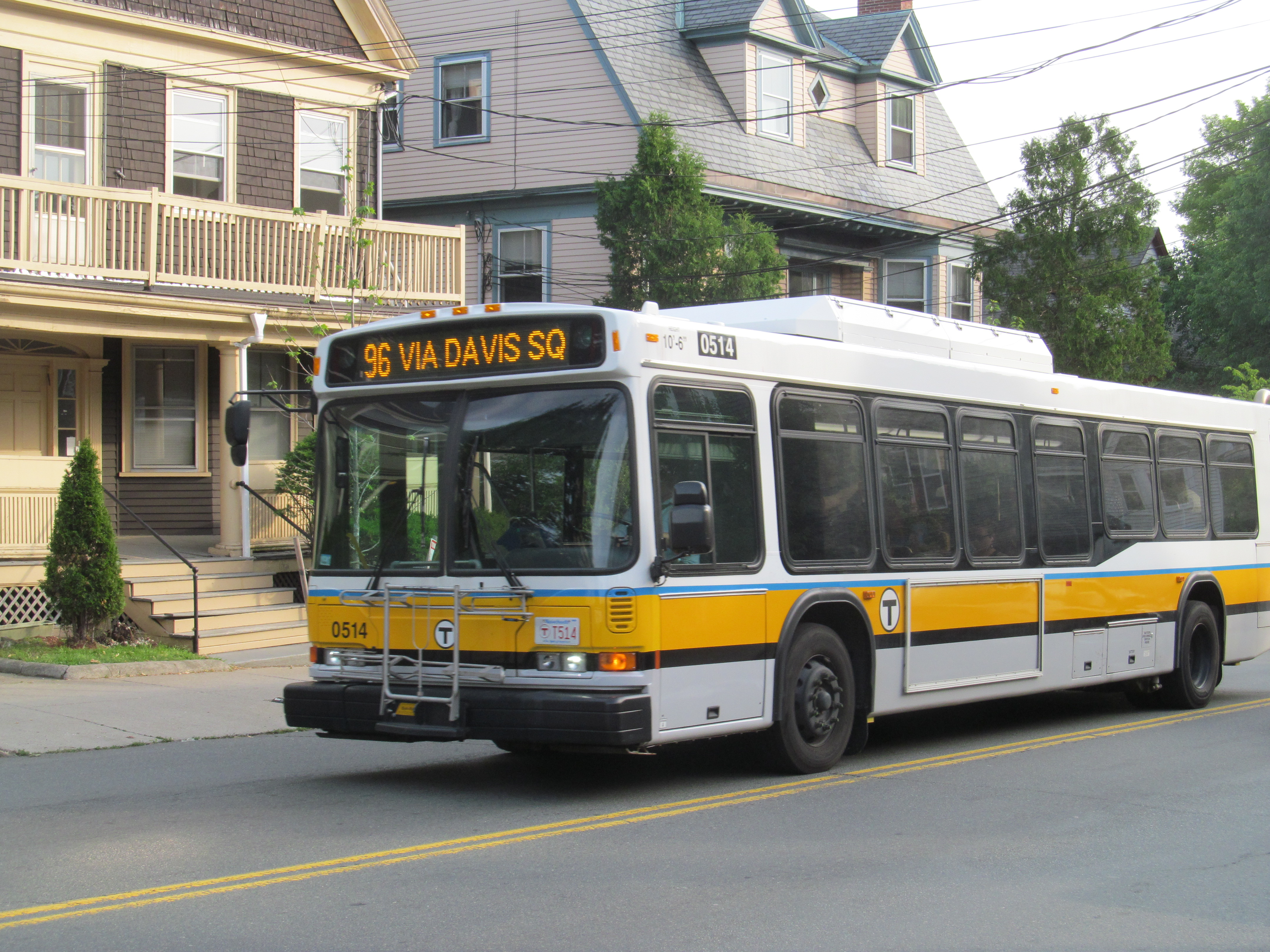
A route 96 bus in Somerville

A route 101 bus on Main Street in Somerville

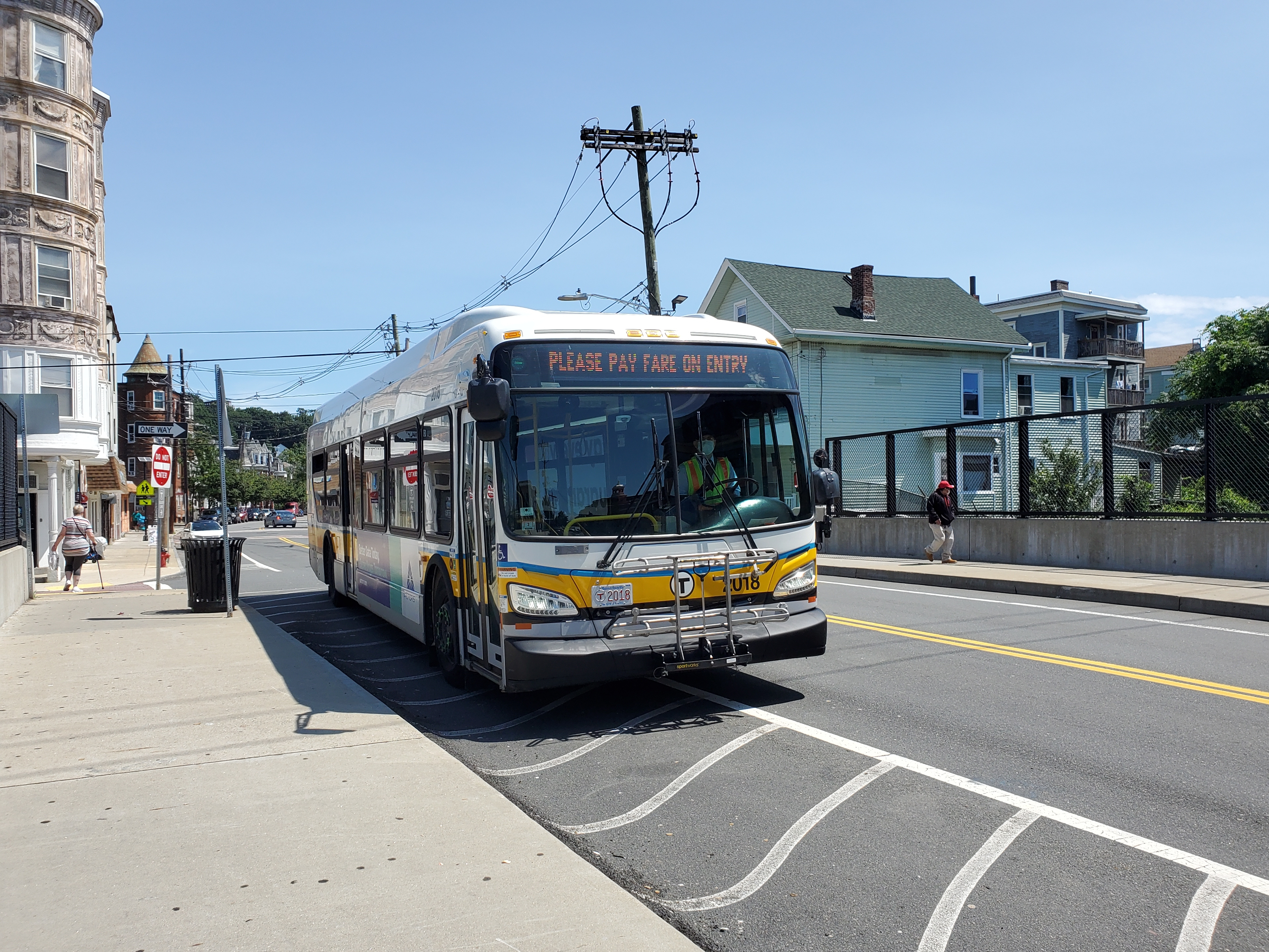
A route 111 bus at Bellingham Square

These routes provide almost all local service in the core of the metropolitan area; most were originally Boston Elevated Railway streetcar routes. The modern system of route numbers first appeared on maps in 1936. Routes were numbered roughly clockwise from southeast (downtown and South Boston) to northeast East Boston. After several changes over the following five years, the numbering has stayed relatively consistent since 1941. The BERy folded into the Metropolitan Transit Authority in 1947, and the M.T.A. in turn was reorganized as the MBTA in 1964. Despite some changes, including minor routes being merged into trunk routes, the core service network has remained roughly intact since the BERy eta. New routes have been added during the M.T.A. and MBTA eras.

Seven routes – 52, 59, 61, 62, 67, 70, and 76 – serve more distant western suburbs including Bedford, Waltham, Lexington, and Needham. They are descendants of routes acquired from the Middlesex and Boston Street Railway in 1972, which were subsequently renumbered using previously discontinued designations.

Fourteen routes – 1, 15, 22, 23, 28, 32, 39, 57, 66, 71, 73, 77, 111, and 116 – were designated as key bus routes in 2004. The highest–ridership routes in the system, they supplement the subway system to provide frequent service to the densest areas of the city. Key bus routes typically operate at higher frequencies than other routes. As part of the implementation of the MBTA's Bus Network Redesign program beginning in 2024, the key bus route terminology is being phased out and replaced by a larger frequent route network. Routes 28 and 39 use 60-foot articulated buses.

Four early morning round trips are run between outlying stations and Haymarket, each running over portions of several local routes. Although intended primarily for station agents, they are open to all passengers. The trips are internally numbered 191–194, but are shown in timetables as variants of local routes.

Route	Description	MBTA link
1	Harvard Square–Nubian station	Link
4	North Station–Marine Park	Link
7	City Point–Otis Street & Summer Street	Link
8	Harbor Point–Kenmore station	Link
9	City Point–Copley Square	Link
10	City Point–Copley Square	Link
11	City Point–Chauncy Street & Summer Street	Link
14	Roslindale Square–Heath Street station	Link
15	Fields Corner station–Ruggles station	Link
16	Forest Hills station–Andrew station or Harbor Point	Link
17	Fields Corner station–Andrew station	Link
18	Ashmont station–Andrew station	Link
19	Fields Corner station–Kenmore station or Ruggles station	Link
21	Ashmont station–Forest Hills station	Link
22	Ashmont station–Ruggles station via Talbot Avenue	Link
23	Ashmont station–Ruggles station via Washington Street	Link
24	Wakefield Avenue–Ashmont station	Link
26	Ashmont station–Norfolk Street Loop	Link
28	Mattapan station–Ruggles station	Link
29	Mattapan station–Jackson Square station	Link
30	Mattapan station–Forest Hills station via Cummins Highway and Roslindale Square	Link
31	Mattapan station–Forest Hills station via Morton Street	Link
32	Wolcott or Cleary Square–Forest Hills station	Link
33	River Street & Milton Street–Mattapan station	Link
34	Dedham Mall–Forest Hills station	Link
34E	Walpole Center–Forest Hills station	Link
35	Dedham Mall or Stimson Street–Forest Hills station	Link
36	Millennium Park or VA Hospital–Forest Hills station	Link
37	Baker Street & Vermont Street–Forest Hills station	Link
38	Wren Street–Forest Hills station	Link
39	Forest Hills station–Back Bay station	Link
40	Georgetowne–Forest Hills station	Link
41	Centre Street & Eliot Street–JFK/UMass station	Link
42	Forest Hills station–Nubian station	Link
43	Ruggles station–Park Street station	Link
44	Jackson Square station–Ruggles station	Link
45	Franklin Park–Ruggles station	Link
47	Central Square, Cambridge–Broadway station	Link
50	Cleary Square–Forest Hills station	Link
51	Reservoir station–Forest Hills station	Link
52	Dedham Mall–Watertown Yard	Link
55	Fenway–Copley Square	Link
57	Watertown Yard–Kenmore station	Link
59	Needham Junction–Watertown Square	Link
60	Chestnut Hill–Kenmore station	Link
61	North Waltham–Waltham Center	Link
62	Bedford VA Hospital–Alewife station	Link
64	Oak Square–Kendall/MIT station	Link
65	Brighton Center–Ruggles station	Link
66	Harvard Square–Nubian station via Allston	Link
67	Turkey Hill–Alewife station	Link
68	Harvard Square–Kendall/MIT station	Link
69	Harvard Square–Lechmere station	Link
70	Market Place Drive or Waltham Center–University Park	Link
71	Watertown Square–Harvard station	Link
73	Waverley Square–Harvard station	Link
74	Belmont Center–Harvard via Concord Avenue	Link
75	Belmont Center–Harvard via Huron Avenue	Link
76	Lincoln Lab–Alewife station	Link
77	Arlington Heights–Harvard station	Link
78	Arlmont Village–Harvard station	Link
80	Arlington Center–Lechmere station	Link
83	Rindge Avenue–Central Square, Cambridge	Link
85	Assembly Row–Ruggles station	Link
86	Harvard–Reservoir station	Link
87	Arlington Center–Lechmere station	Link
88	Clarendon Hill–Lechmere station	Link
89	Clarendon Hill or Davis station–Sullivan Square station	Link
90	Davis station–Assembly Row	Link
91	Sullivan Square station–Central Square, Cambridge	Link
92	Sullivan Square station–Downtown via Main Street	Link
93	Sullivan Square station–Downtown via Bunker Hill Street	Link
94	Medford Square–Davis station	Link
95	West Medford or Arlington Center–Sullivan Square station	Link
96	Medford Square–Harvard station	Link
97	Malden Center station–Wellington station	Link
99	Woodland Road–Wellington station	Link
100	Elm Street–Wellington station	Link
101	Malden Center station–Sullivan Square station via Winter Hill	Link
104	Malden Center station–Airport via Ferry Street	Link
105	Malden Center station–Sullivan Square station via Newland Street Housing	Link
106	Lebanon Loop–Wellington station	Link
108	Linden Square–Wellington station	Link
109	Linden Square–Harvard station	Link
110	Wonderland station–Wellington station	Link
111	Woodlawn–Haymarket station	Link
112	Wellington station–Wood Island station	Link
114	Market Basket–Maverick station	Link
116	Wonderland station–Maverick station via Revere Street	Link
119	Northgate Shopping Center–Beachmont station	Link
120	Orient Heights station–Jeffries Point	Link
121	Wood Island station–Maverick station	Link

== 131–137 ==
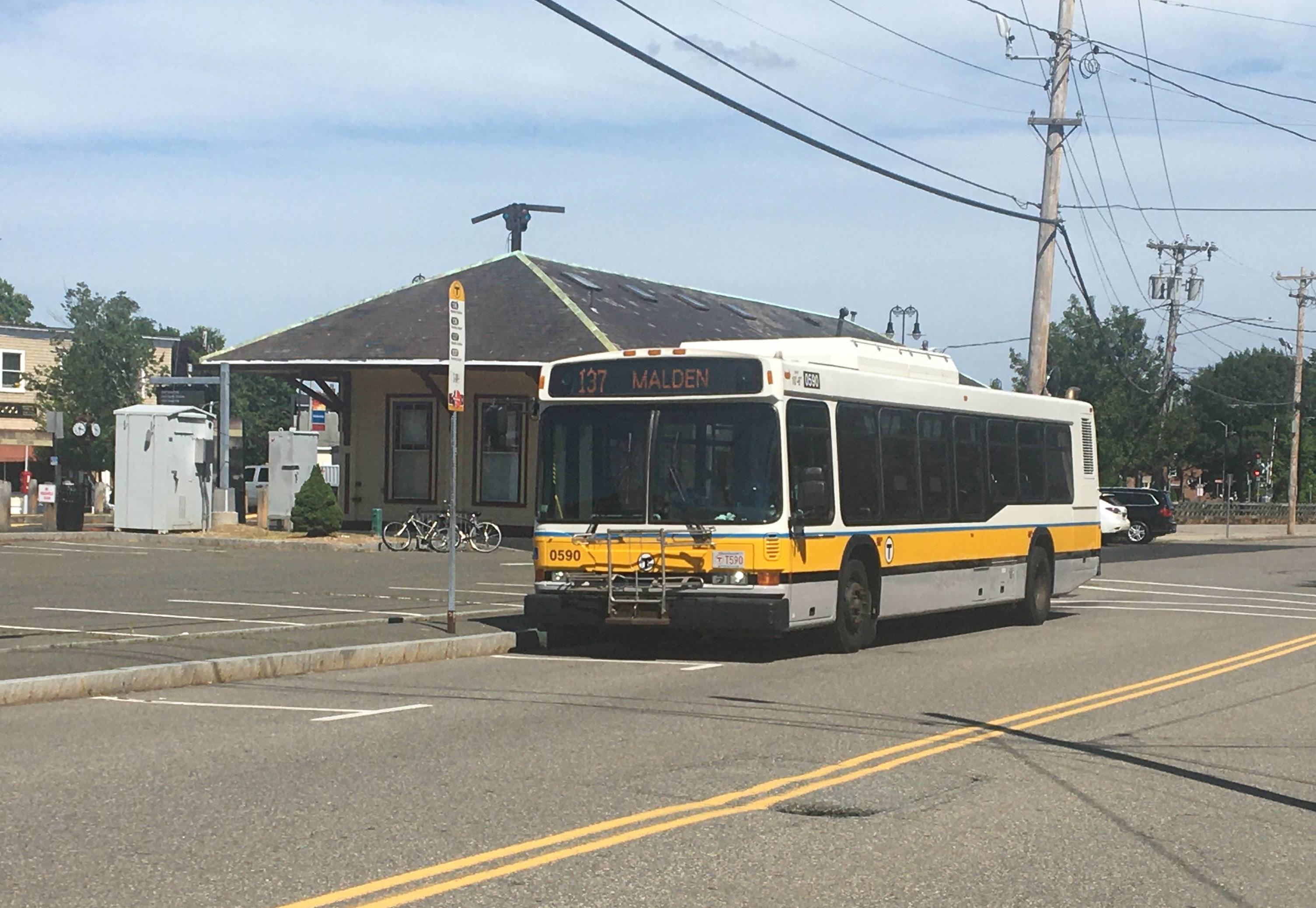
A route 137 bus at Reading station

Numbers from 131 to 137 operate in the Melrose area; their routings are based on routes operated as part of the former Eastern Massachusetts Street Railway, which was folded into the MBTA system in 1968. The since-discontinued 136 and the 137 were briefly operated as far as Lowell and Lawrence, their original Eastern Mass terminals, while under MBTA control. The 132 was a Service Bus Lines route which was not operated by the MBTA until 1975.

Route	Description	MBTA link
131	Melrose Highlands–Oak Grove or Malden Center station	Link
132	Redstone Shopping Center–Malden Center station	Link
134	North Woburn–Wellington station	Link
137	Reading Depot–Malden Center station	Link

== 171 ==
Route 171 is a special low-service route – a replacement for early morning CT3 service when it was cut back from Logan Airport in 2002. Other numbers in the 170s were previously used for special routes, largely short-lived routes serving industrial areas.

Route	Description	MBTA link
171	Logan Airport terminals–Nubian station	Link

== 201–202 ==
The 20 belt route was created by the M.T.A. in 1962 as a combination of the 20 and 21 stub routes inherited from BERy. In 2005, the MBTA redesignated the two directions of the loop as the 201 and 202 to avoid confusion about which way each bus ran.

Route	Description	MBTA link
201	Fields Corner Loop via Neponset Avenue	Link
202	Fields Corner Loop via Adams Street	Link

== 210–245 ==
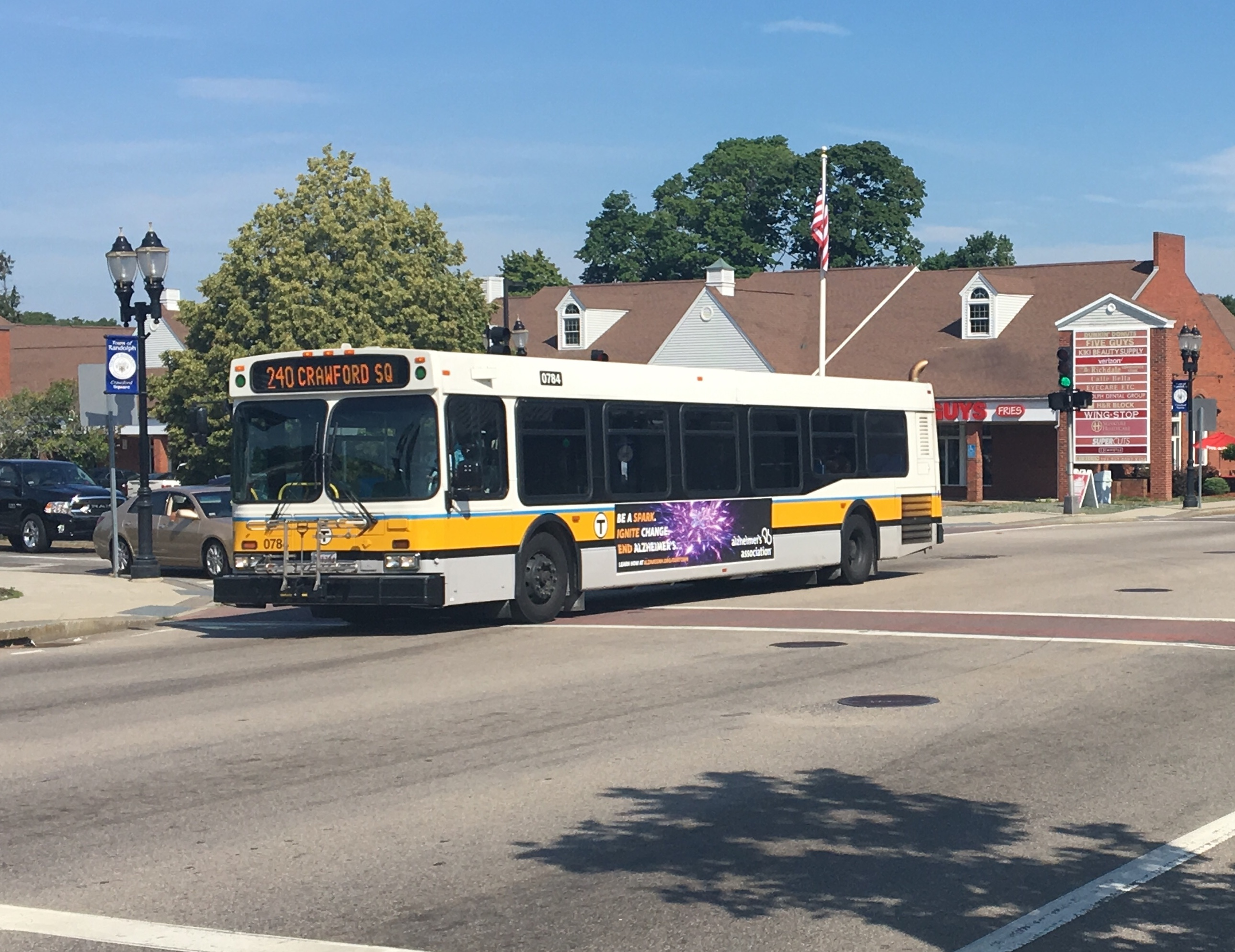
A route 240 bus in Randolph

These routes operate in the Quincy area. Routes 210-245 are based on routes originally operated by the Eastern Massachusetts Street Railway (folded into the MBTA in 1968) which mostly ran into Fields Corner station. When the Red Line's Braintree Branch opened in phases in 1971 and 1980s, these routes were rerouted to terminate at the new rapid transit stations (principally Quincy Center).

Route	Description	MBTA link
210	Quincy Center station–Fields Corner station	Link
211	Quincy Center station–Squantum	Link
215	Quincy Center station–Ashmont station via West Quincy	Link
216	Houghs Neck–Quincy Center station via Germantown	Link
217	Quincy Center station–Ashmont station	Link
220	Hingham Depot–Quincy Center station	Link
222	Lovell Corners–Quincy Center station	Link
225	Weymouth Landing–Quincy Center station	Link
226	Columbian Square–Braintree station	Link
230	Montello station–Quincy Center station	Link
236	South Shore Plaza–Quincy Center station	Link
238	Holbrook/Randolph station–Quincy Center station	Link
240	Avon Square–Ashmont station	Link
245	Quincy Center station–Mattapan station	Link

== 350–354 ==
These routes operate in the Burlington and Woburn area. They are the descendants of the Eastern Massachusetts Street Railway's Lowell–Boston route, which was inherited intact by the MBTA in 1968 and soon cut back to Burlington.

Route	Description	MBTA link
350	North Burlington–Alewife station	Link
351	Bedford Woods Drive–Third Avenue	Link
354	North Burlington–State Street, Boston	Link

== 411–465 ==
These routes operate in the Lynn area and the North Shore. Two routes that run to Haymarket have weekend short-turn variants (labeled with a W suffix) that terminate at Wonderland. The 411 and 430 were Service Bus Lines routes that were acquired by the MBTA in 1975; the other routes are largely Eastern Massachusetts Street Railway routes acquired in 1968.

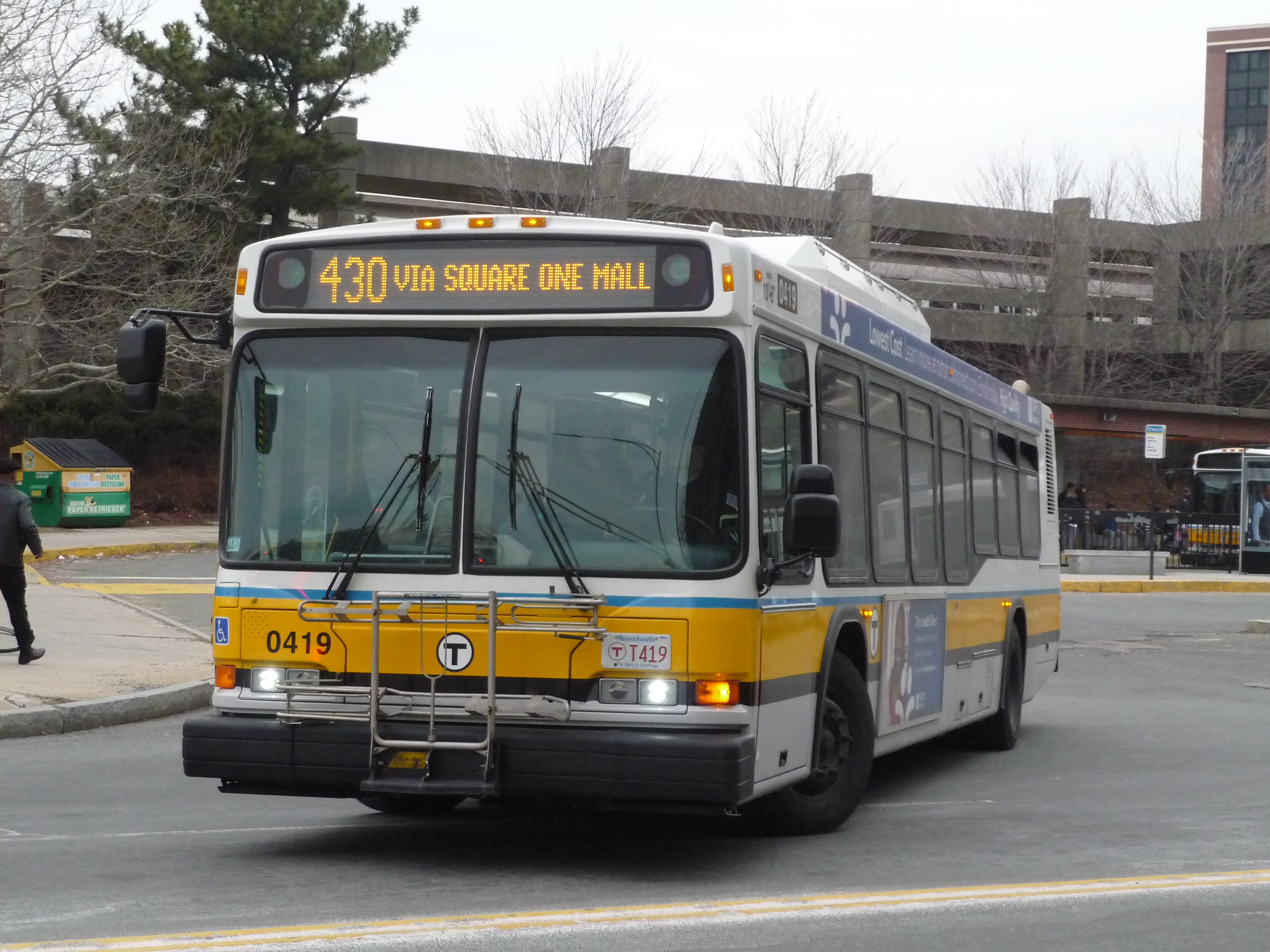
A route 430 bus leaving Malden Center station

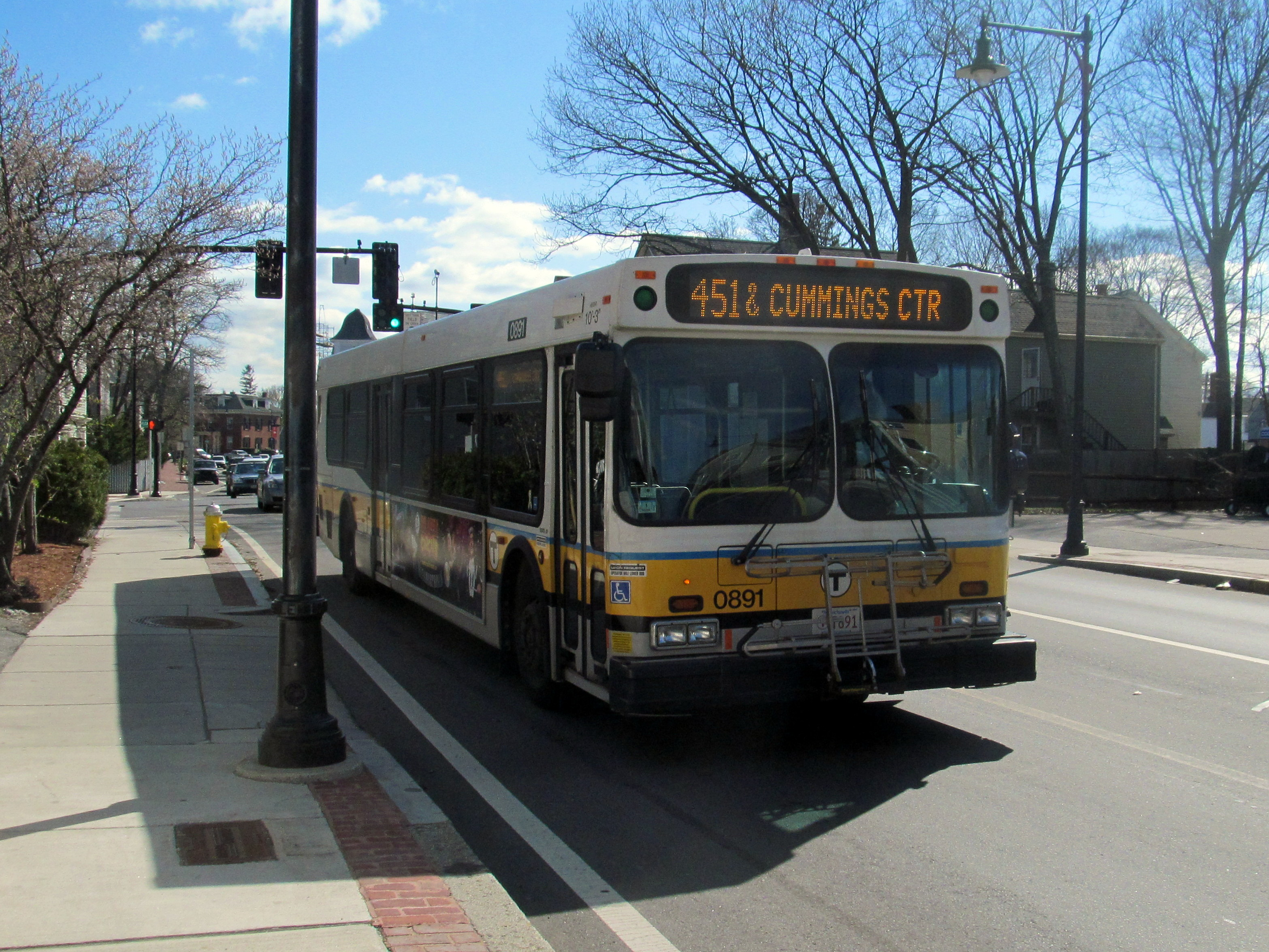
A route 451 bus on Route 1A in Salem

Route	Description	MBTA link
411	Kennedy Drive or Jack Satter House–Malden Center station	Link
424	Eastern Avenue & Essex Street–Wonderland station	Link
426	Central Square, Lynn–Haymarket station	Link
426W	Central Square, Lynn–Wonderland station	Link
428	Oaklandvale–Haymarket station	Link
429	Northgate Shopping Center–Central Square, Lynn	Link
430	Saugus Center–Malden Center station	Link
435	Liberty Tree Mall–Central Square, Lynn via Peabody Square	Link
436	Liberty Tree Mall–Central Square, Lynn via Goodwin Circle	Link
439	Nahant–Wonderland station	Link
441	Marblehead–Wonderland station via Paradise Road	Link
442	Marblehead–Wonderland station via Humphrey Street	Link
450	Salem Depot–Haymarket station	Link
450W	Salem Depot–Wonderland station	Link
451	North Beverly station–Salem Depot	Link
455	Salem Depot–Wonderland station	Link
456	Salem Depot–Central Square, Lynn	Link
465	Salem Depot– Danvers Square via Liberty Tree Mall	Link

== 501–558 ==
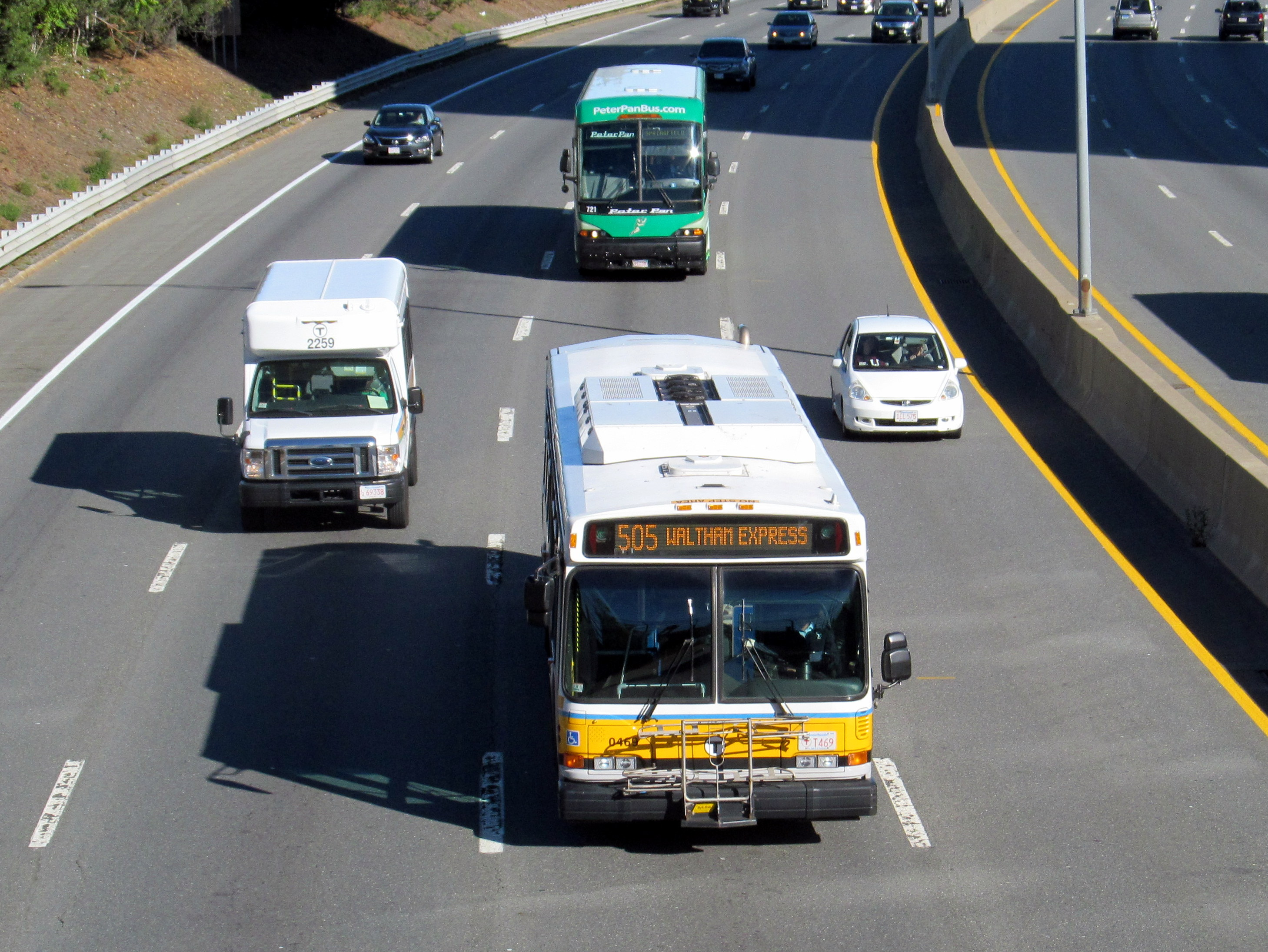
A route 505 bus on the Mass Pike

These routes operate express between Newton and downtown Boston via the Massachusetts Turnpike (I-90). The 500 series routes were created by the MBTA in the 1960s to take advantage of the newly constructed turnpike extension into Boston. The 550 series routes were Middlesex and Boston Street Railway routes to Newton Corner that were extended to downtown Boston in the 1960s and taken over by the MBTA in 1972. They were cut back to Newton Corner in 2020.

Route	Description	MBTA link
501	Brighton Center–Federal Street & Franklin Street	Link
504	Watertown Yard–Federal Street & Franklin Street	Link
505	Waltham Center–Federal Street & Franklin Street	Link
553	Roberts–Newton Corner	Link
554	Waverley Square–Newton Corner	Link
556	Waltham Highlands–Newton Corner	Link
558	Riverside station–Newton Corner	Link

== Privately operated routes ==
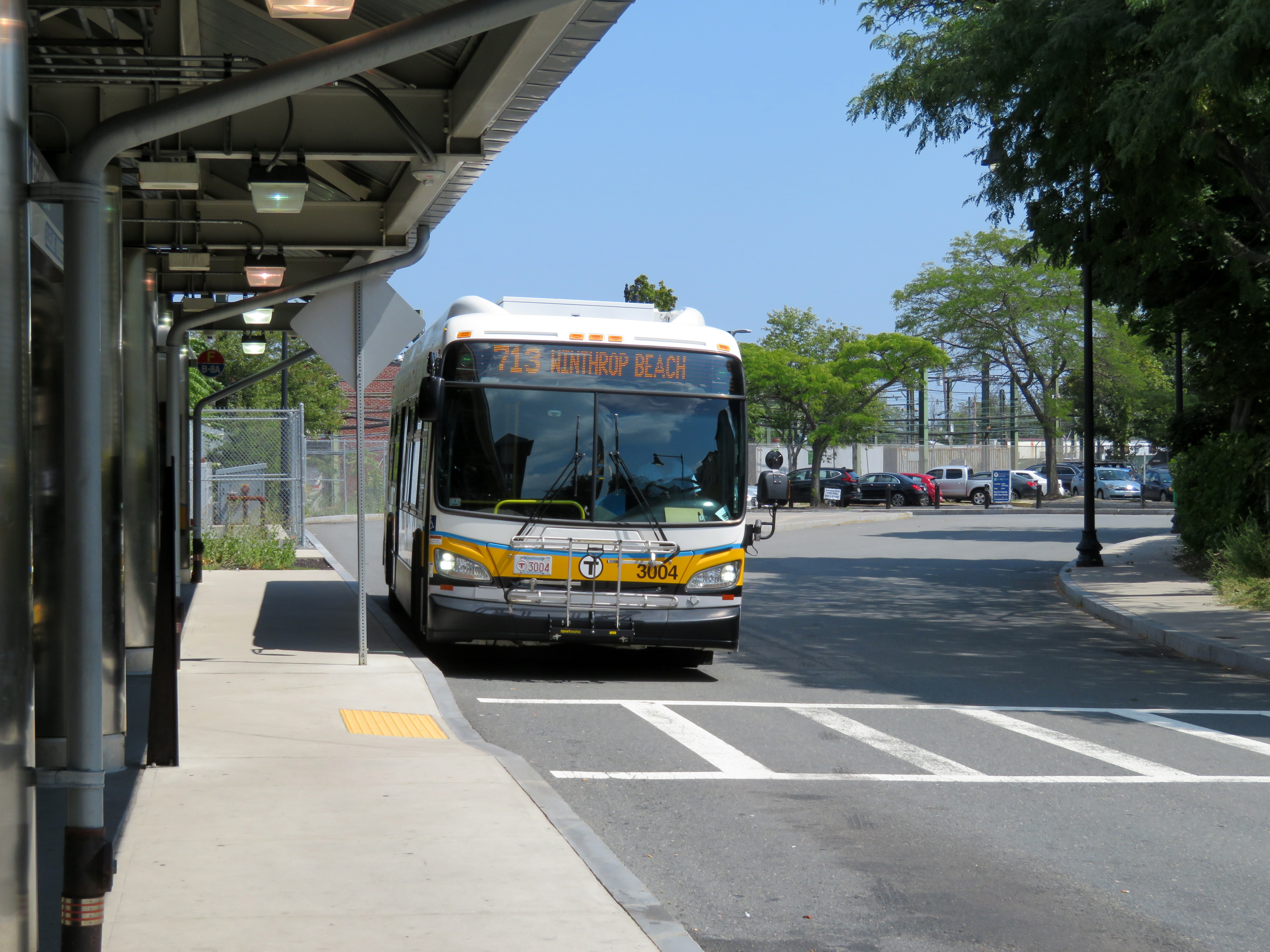
An MBTA bus operated by Paul Revere Transportation running on route 713 at Orient Heights station in 2018

The MBTA provides partial subsidy for some suburban routes outside its usual service area that connect with MBTA bus, subway, or commuter rail service. Routes 712-716 are radial commuter routes that were taken over from various private operators (Paul Revere Transportation for the 712/713 and DPV Transportation for the 714/716).

The non-numbered routes (listed here by their designator on MBTA maps) are local circulator services founded by the municipalities with partial MBTA subsidy. Two systems are operated by private companies under contract.

Route	Description	MBTA link	Operator
712	Point Shirley, Winthrop–Orient Heights station via Revere Street	Link	Paul Revere Transportation
713	Point Shirley, Winthrop–Orient Heights station via Winthrop Center	Link	Paul Revere Transportation
714	Pemberton Point, Hull–Station Street, Hingham	Link	DPV Transportation
716	Cobbs Corner–Mattapan station	Link	DPV Transportation
LEX	Lexington Lexpress (4 routes)	Link	Town of Lexington
MIS	Mission Hill LINK (2 routes)	Link	TransAction
