= Wood Island station =

Rapid transit station in Boston, Massachusetts, US

Wood Island
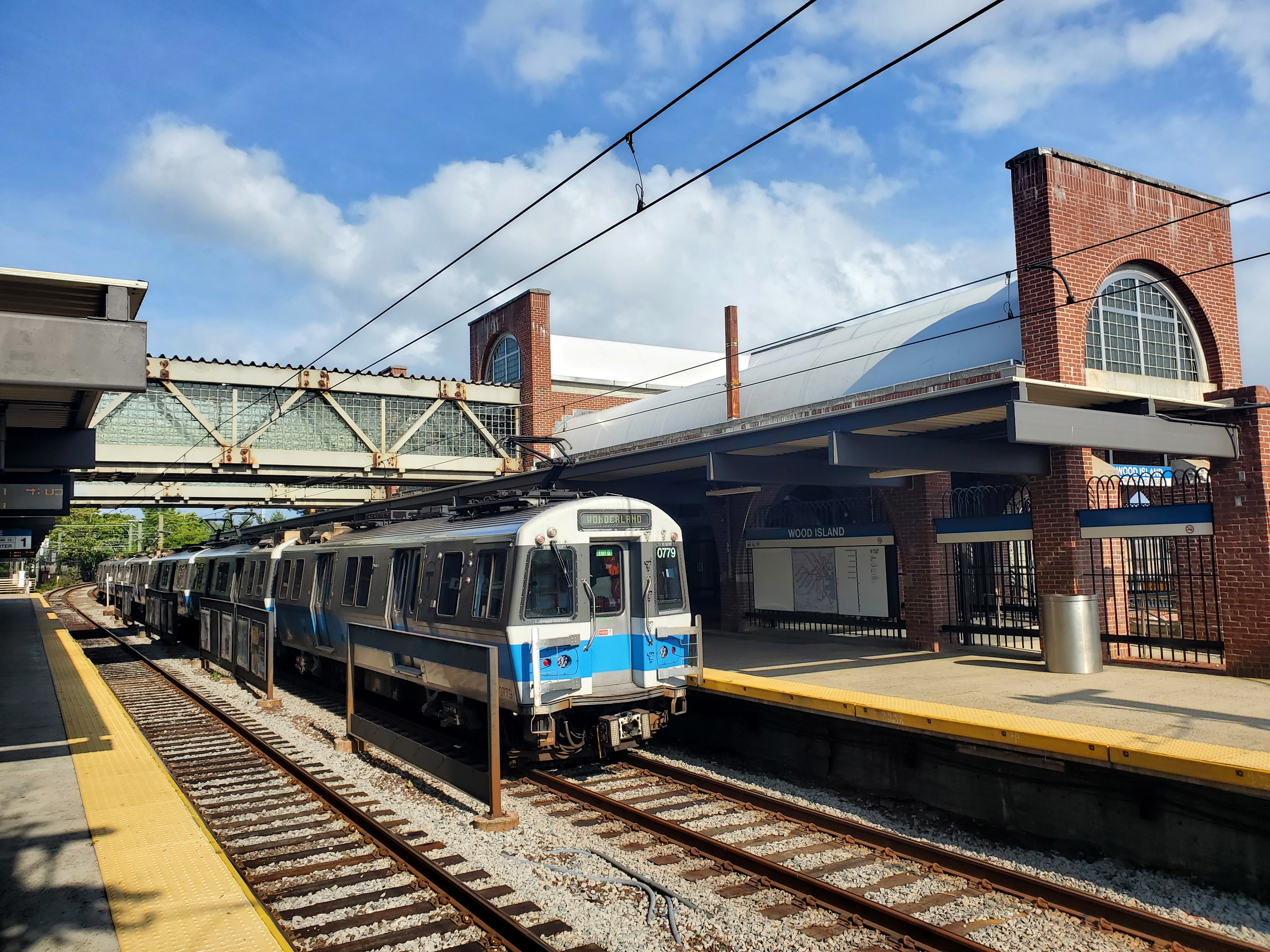
- An outbound train at Wood Island station in 2024

General information
- Location: 450 Bennington Street; East Boston, Boston, Massachusetts
- Coordinates: 42.37967°N 71.02292°W
- Line: Revere Extension
- Platforms: 2 side platforms
- Tracks: 2
- Connections: MBTA bus: 112, 120, 121

Construction
- Cycle facilities: 10
- Accessible: yes

History
- Opened: January 5, 1952
- Rebuilt: 1994–1995
- Former names: Day Square (1952–1954); Wood Island Park (1954–1967)

Passengers
- FY2019: 2,102 daily boardings

Services
Preceding station	MBTA	Following station
Airport toward Bowdoin	Blue Line	Orient Heights toward Wonderland
Location

Wood Island station is an MBTA Blue Line rapid transit station located off Bennington Street (Route 145) in the Day Square section of East Boston, Boston, Massachusetts. The station is adjacent to and named for the former Wood Island Park, a once heavily used recreational area for East Boston residents. Most of the park was destroyed in the mid 1960s to expand Logan International Airport. It was built in 1952, replacing a pair of Boston, Revere Beach and Lynn Railroad stations that served the area.

== History ==
=== Predecessor stations ===
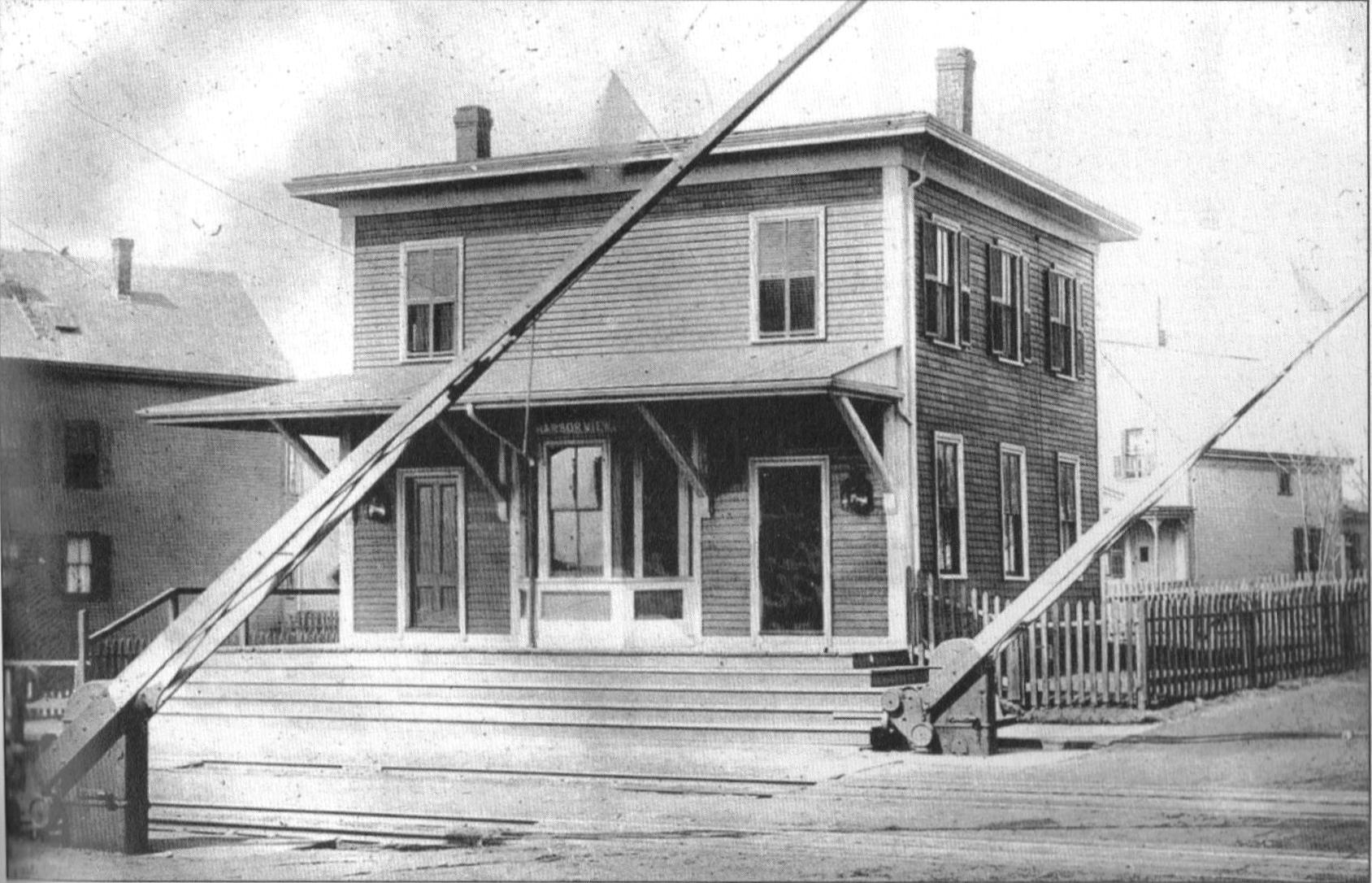
Harbor View station in 1907. The original Wood Island station was of a similar design.

The narrow gauge Boston, Revere Beach and Lynn Railroad (BRB&L) opened from East Boston to Lynn on July 29, 1875.

Wood Island station was located at Prescott Street in what was then the Wood Island neighborhood, approximately at 42°22′28.6″N 71°1′25.45″W. It opened along with the rest of the line on July 29, 1875. The station was abandoned when the BRB&L ceased operations in 1940, and demolished several years later during expansion of Logan Airport. The station site is now occupied by aviation support businesses.

Harbor View, the next station to the northeast, was located at Short Street at 42°22′51.36″N 71°0′58.14″W. Harbor View was a boxy station of identical design to Wood Island, though it was not an original station on the line and opened later than its twin. Located a short walk from Bennington Street, it lost much of its ridership to East Boston Tunnel trolleys, and was closed significantly sooner than the rest of the BRB&L. The building was sold, moved closer to Cowper Street, and converted to a private residence.

By 1928 the line was electrified, with pre-pay stations - more a rapid transit line than a conventional railroad. However, due to the Great Depression, the BRB&L shut down on January 27, 1940.

=== Rapid transit ===
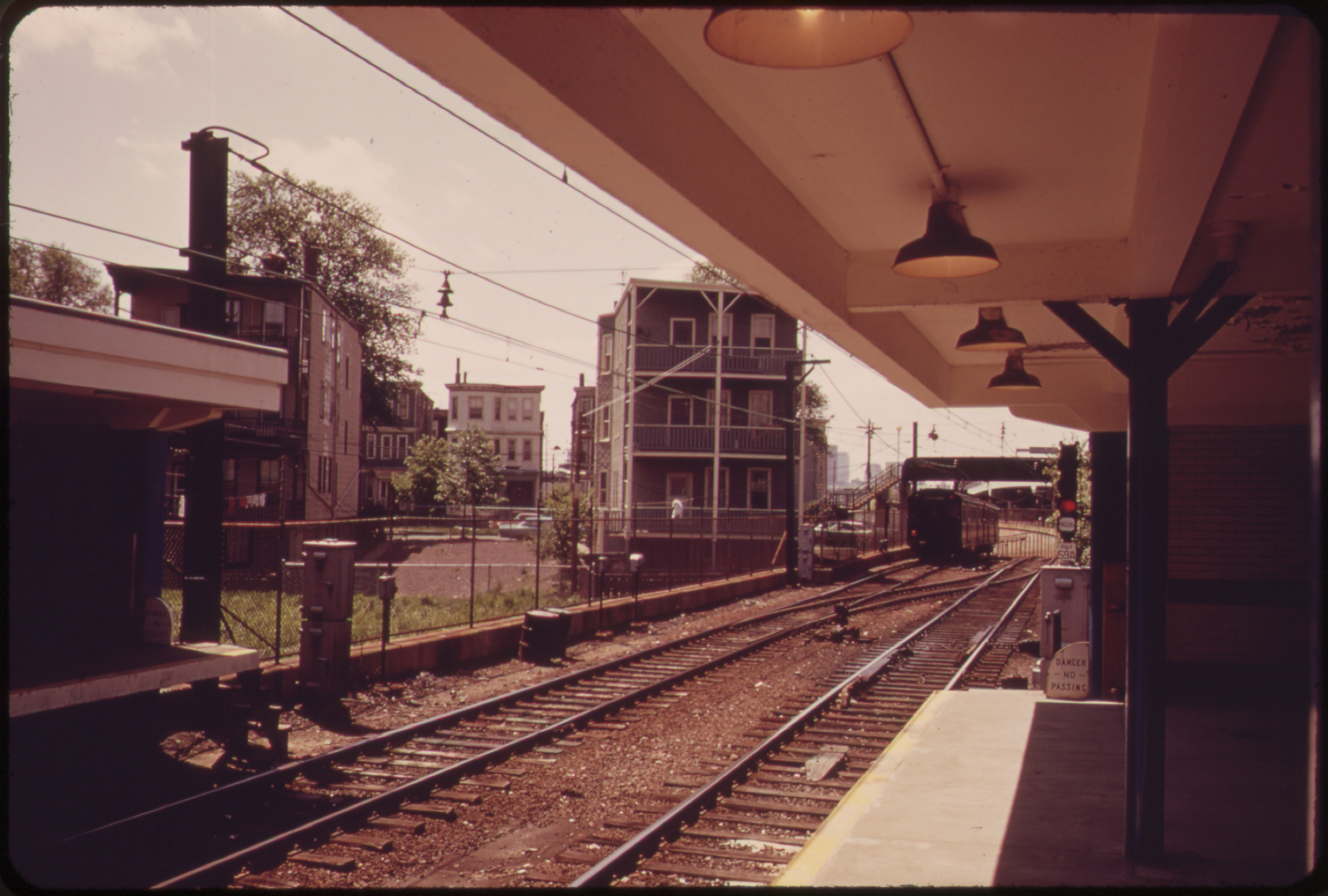
An outbound train approaching Wood Island in 1973

In 1941, the Boston Elevated Railway bought the BRB&L right of way from Day Square to Revere Beach for use as a high-speed trolley line similar to the Ashmont–Mattapan High-Speed Line; these plans were delayed by the onset of World War II. However, the 1926 Report on Improved Transportation Facilities and 1945–47 Coolidge Commission Report recommended that the East Boston Tunnel line, which had been converted to rapid transit from streetcars in 1924, be extended to Lynn via the BBRB&L route rather than using it for a trolley line.

In 1947, the newly formed Metropolitan Transit Authority (M.T.A.) decided to build to Lynn as a rapid transit line, and construction began in October 1948. The first part of the Revere Extension opened to Orient Heights on January 5, 1952, with intermediate stations at Airport Station and Day Square. M.T.A. built Day Square station on a new section of right-of-way, which connected the former Eastern Railroad's East Boston Branch (used by the extension as far as Airport Station) with the BRB&L at Harbor View. The station was located between the former Wood Island and Harbor View stations, serving Day Square and the Neptune Road / Wood Island Park development designed by Frederick Law Olmsted.

Day Square station had its platforms at ground level, with an elevated busway for buses and trackless trolleys located above the platforms. A loop for these vehicles extended over a parking lot south of the station. The extension to Airport, Day Square, and Orient Heights opened on January 5, 1952, with further completion to Wonderland station in 1954. The MTA began charging for parking at its stations, including Day Square, on November 2, 1953.

Day Square station was renamed Wood Island Park on October 21, 1954. In early 1967, as part of a series of station name changes, Wood Island Park was changed again to Wood Island, as Wood Island Park had been destroyed during the expansion of Logan Airport. The loop of the elevated busway was removed in the 1970s.

=== Modernization ===
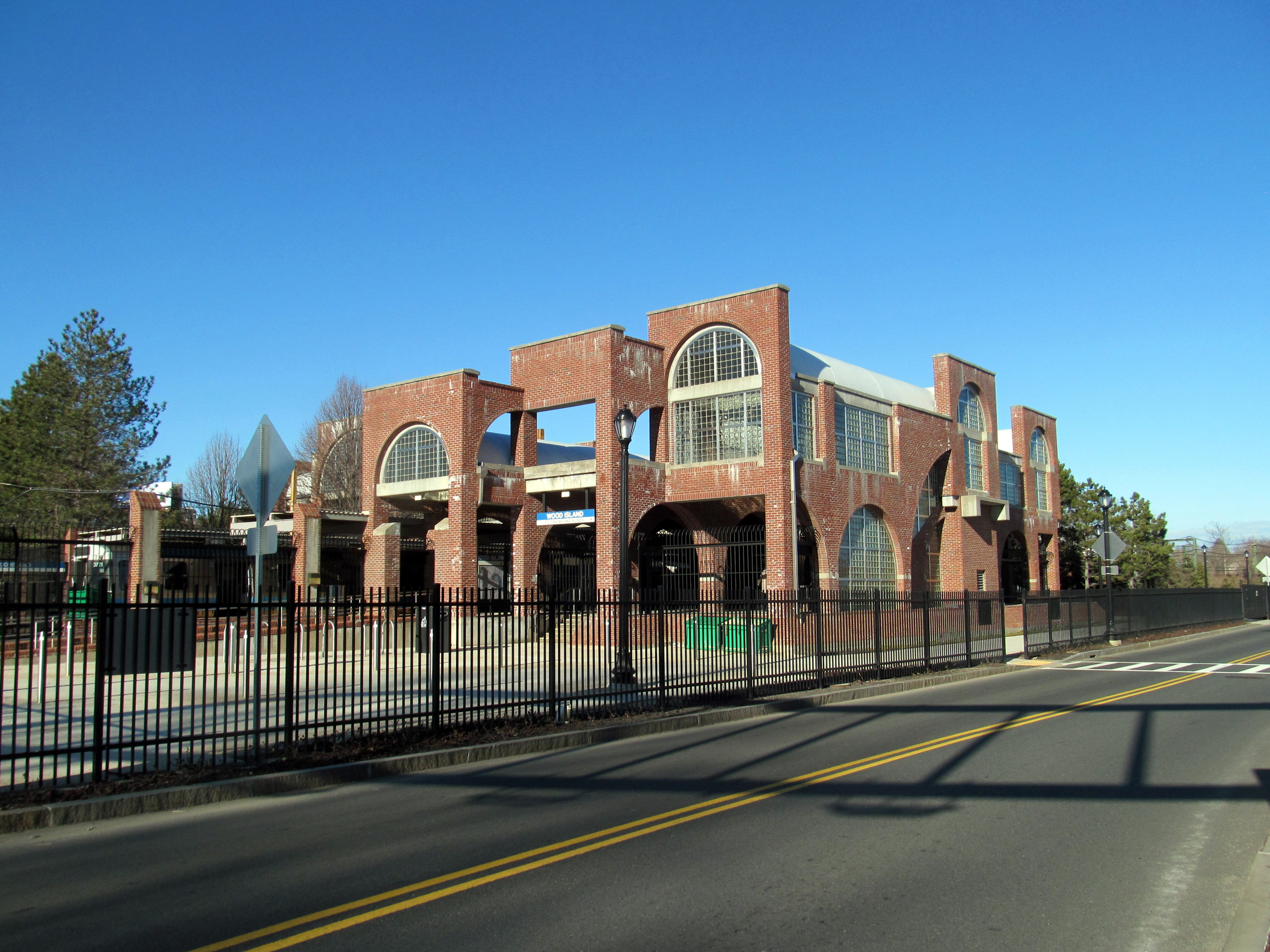
The brick station built in 1995

In 1988, the MBTA began planning the Blue Line Modernization Project, which included accessibility modifications as well as platform extensions to accommodate 6-car trains. The project was then expected to be complete in 1994. In 1989, the MBTA awarded design contracts for modernization and platform lengthening (to allow six-car trains) at nine Blue Line stations, including Wood Island. Wood Island entered the final design stage on January 3, 1991. The MBTA received federal funding in 1992 for the project, which was seen as the most critical of the first phase of station reconstructions. The rebuilt Wood Island would be needed as a bus terminal during the relocation of Airport station, which in turn was needed to accommodate construction of the Third Harbor Tunnel.

Demolition of the elevated structure at Wood Island began in November 1993 under a $10.4 million contract. On June 25, 1994, the line was cut back to Orient Heights at all times to permit reconstruction of the outer stations; Wood Island remained open during construction. Beachmont and Wood Island were completely rebuilt, while Suffolk Downs, Revere Beach, and Wonderland were renovated. The outer stations reopened on June 26, 1995, with Wood Island completed several months later. Unlike the other stations, Wood Island was not fully accessible after the 1994-95 renovation; the elevators were not usable until 2000.

The platforms installed during the 1994-95 construction did not age well, and were replaced during a series of short-term station closures in 2008. Wood Island was closed from July 7 to September 5, 2008, for a renovation of both platforms. A 2024 city plan calls for reuse of an unused stub of Frankfort Street as an extension of the station busway for route 120 buses.
