= Beachmont station =

Rapid transit station in Revere, Massachusetts, US

Beachmont
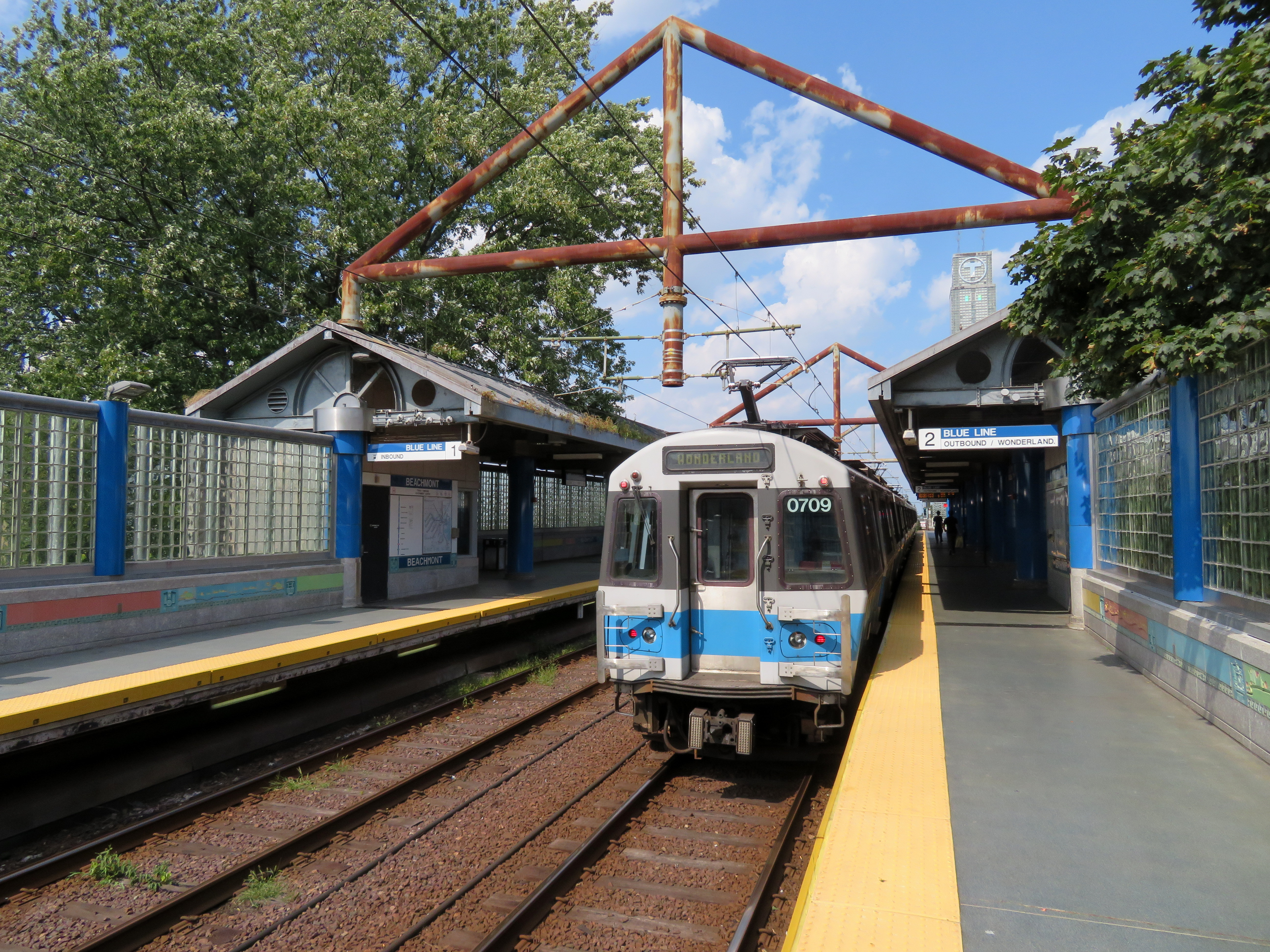
- An outbound train at Beachmont station in August 2018

General information
- Location: 630 Winthrop Avenue at 1 Bennington Street; Revere, Massachusetts
- Coordinates: 42.3973°N 70.9926°W
- Line: Revere Extension
- Platforms: 2 side platforms
- Tracks: 2
- Connections: MBTA bus: 119

Construction
- Structure type: Elevated
- Parking: 430 spaces ($5.00 fee)
- Cycle facilities: 6 spaces
- Accessible: Yes

History
- Opened: June 19, 1954
- Rebuilt: June 25, 1994–June 24, 1995

Passengers
- FY2019: 3,139 daily boardings

Services
Preceding station	MBTA	Following station
Suffolk Downs toward Bowdoin	Blue Line	Revere Beach toward Wonderland
Location

Beachmont station is an elevated rapid transit station in Revere, Massachusetts. It serves the MBTA Blue Line, and is located above Winthrop Avenue in the Beachmont neighborhood. Beachmont station is fully accessible, with elevators from the lobby to the platforms.

== History ==
=== BRB&L ===
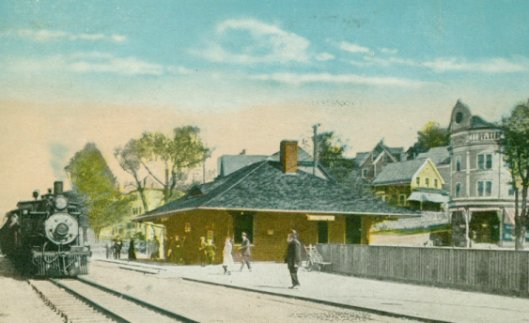
Beachmont station on an early postcard

The narrow gauge Boston, Revere Beach and Lynn Railroad (BRB&L) opened from East Boston to Lynn on July 28, 1875. Among the original stations was Orient (also called Orient Heights) at Winthrop Avenue. (At that time, Beachmont was considered part of Orient Heights.) The Boston Land Company, affiliated with the BRB&L, used the station to sell land on Beachmont. The BRB&L built the Beachmont hotel near the station in 1876. The station was renamed Beachmont by the 1880s, with a station building located southeast of the crossing.

Ocean Pier station was open for several years at Dolphin Avenue 0.3 miles (0.5 km) to the north in the 1880s, likely to compete with a competitor – the Eastern Railroad-backed Boston, Winthrop and Shore Railroad – which operated in 1884 and 1885.

By 1928 the line was electrified, with pre-pay stations - more a rapid transit line than a conventional railroad. However, due to the Great Depression, the BRB&L shut down on January 27, 1940.

=== Rapid transit ===
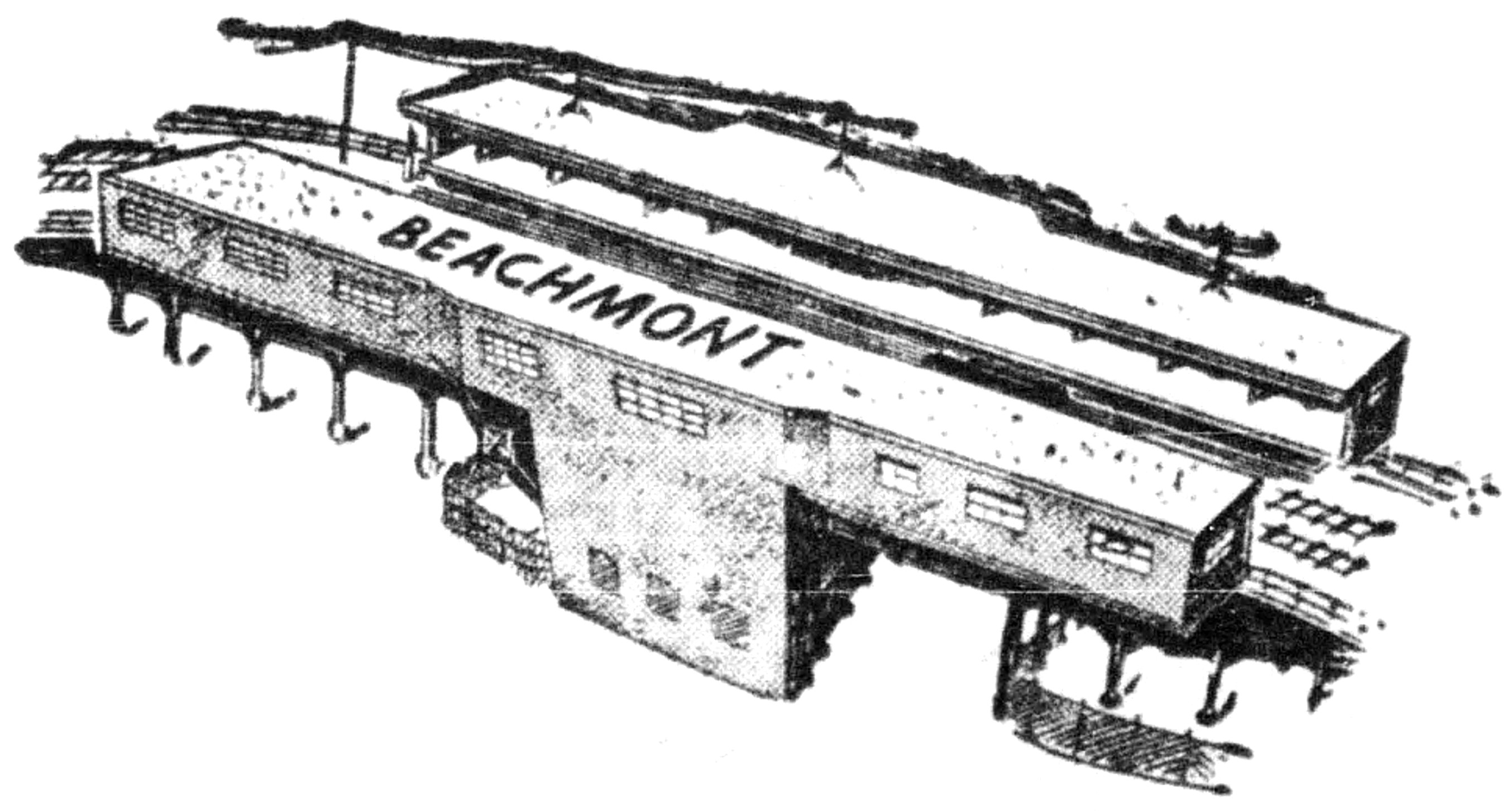
A 1954 isometric drawing of the station

In 1941, the Boston Elevated Railway bought the BRB&L right of way from Day Square to Revere Beach for use as a high-speed trolley line similar to the Ashmont–Mattapan High-Speed Line; these plans were delayed by the onset of World War II. However, the 1926 Report on Improved Transportation Facilities and 1945–47 Coolidge Commission Report recommended that the East Boston Tunnel line, which had been converted to rapid transit from streetcars in 1924, be extended to Lynn via the BBRB&L route rather than using it for a trolley line.

In 1947, the newly formed Metropolitan Transit Authority (M.T.A.) decided to build to Lynn as a rapid transit line, and construction began in October 1948. The first part of the Revere Extension opened to Orient Heights in January 1952 and Suffolk Downs in April 1952; the second phase (cut short due to limited funds) opened to Wonderland on January 19, 1954, with intermediate stations at Beachmont and Revere Beach. Unlike its predecessor, this Beachmont station was elevated to eliminate the grade crossing of Winthrop Avenue.

=== Renovations ===
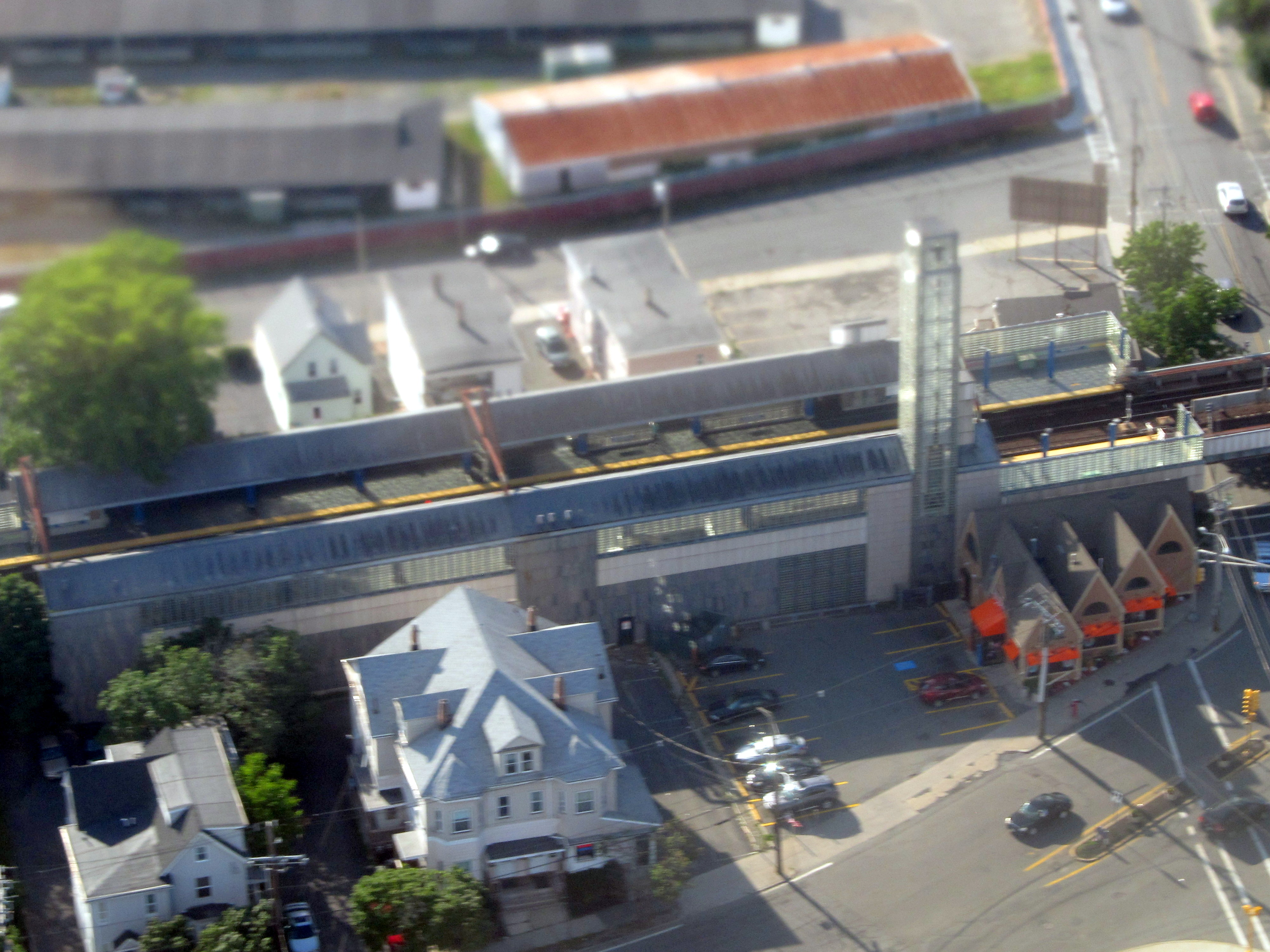
Aerial view of the 1995-built Beachmont station

When the MBTA planned the Blue Line Modernization Program in the early 1990s, local residents requested that the station be lowered into an open cut similar to Revere Beach, but this was deemed infeasible. The station was closed for approximately one year starting on June 25, 1994, as the station was rebuilt along with the Suffolk Downs, Revere Beach and Wonderland stations. Blue Line service temporarily ended at Orient Heights and buses served the closed stations during the project. Beachmont station was completely rebuilt at a cost of $27 million; it reopened along with the other stations on June 24, 1995.

The station was closed while additional platform repair work was performed from September 8 through November 25, 2008. On June 1–2, 2019, the 1995-added radio tower was demolished.

The redevelopment of the Suffolk Downs site is expected to substantially increase ridership to Suffolk Downs and Beachmont stations. The developer has committed $20 million for transit projects, including modifications to both stations. In 2021, the MBTA indicated plans to construct a bus transfer facility at the station to replace or supplement Wonderland for North Shore bus routes.
