= Revere Beach station =

Rapid transit station in Revere, Massachusetts, US

Revere Beach
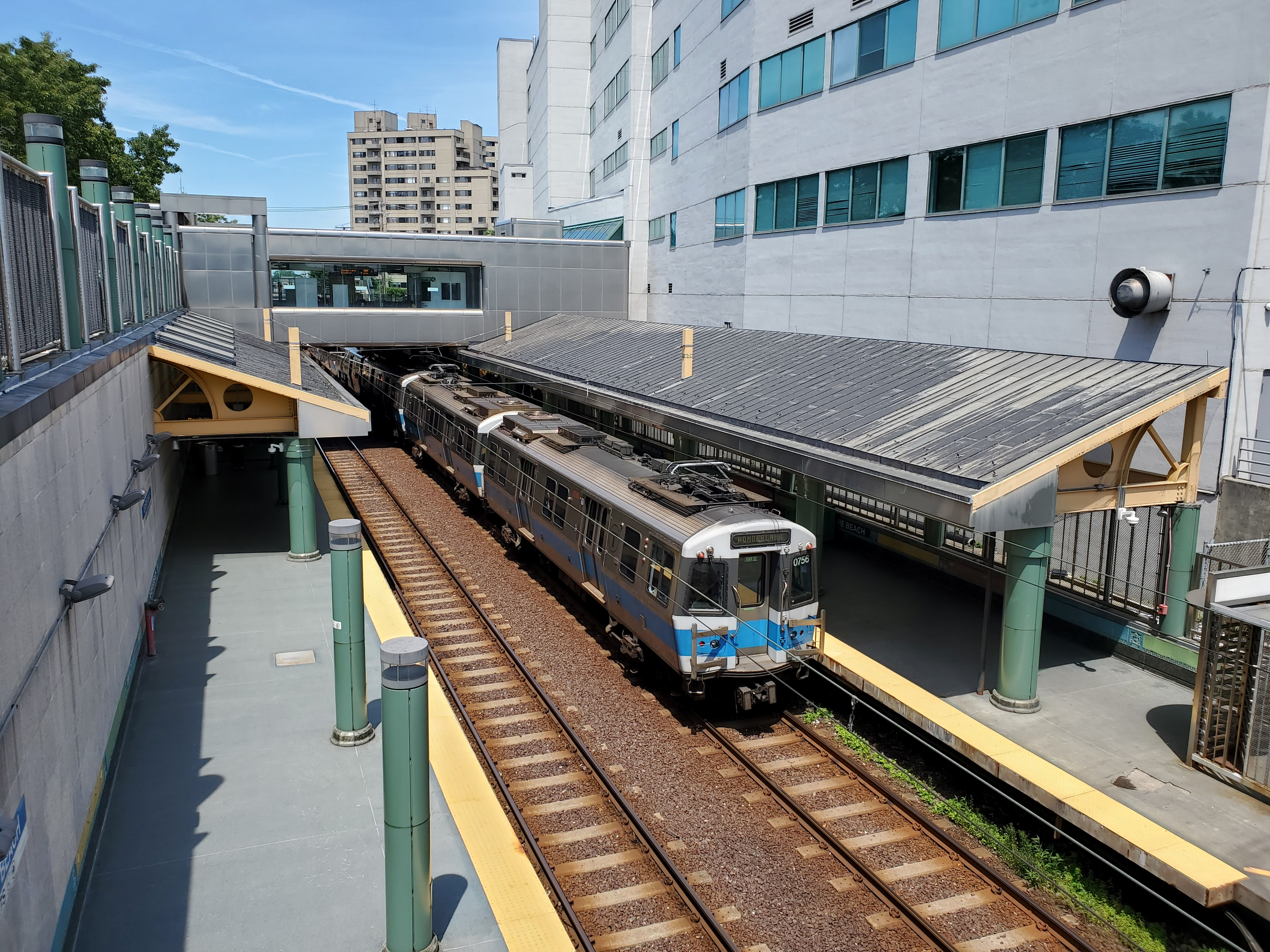
- An outbound train at Revere Beach station in July 2021

General information
- Location: 220 Shirley Avenue at 300 Ocean Avenue; Revere, Massachusetts
- Coordinates: 42.40788°N 70.99254°W
- Line: Revere Extension
- Platforms: 2 side platforms
- Tracks: 2
- Connections: MBTA bus: 110, 411

Construction
- Structure type: Open cut
- Cycle facilities: 11 spaces
- Accessible: yes

History
- Opened: June 19, 1954
- Rebuilt: June 25, 1994–June 24, 1995
- Former names: Crescent Beach (BRB&L)

Passengers
- FY2019: 3,098 daily boardings

Services
Preceding station	MBTA	Following station
Beachmont toward Bowdoin	Blue Line	Wonderland Terminus
Location

Revere Beach station is a rapid transit station in Revere, Massachusetts. Located between Beach Street and Shirley Avenue, it serves the MBTA Blue Line. It serves Revere Beach, a popular summer destination with a substantial year-round resident population. It opened in January 1954 on the site of a former Boston, Revere Beach and Lynn Railroad station, as part of an extension to Wonderland. Revere Beach station was closed and rebuilt from 1994 to 1995.

Like all Blue Line stations from Airport east, Revere Beach has two tracks and two side platforms. Uniquely among Blue Line stations, it is located below grade in a trench, with a surface-level fare lobby. Entrances to the station are from Beach Street and Shirley Avenue.

== History ==
=== Boston, Revere Beach and Lynn ===
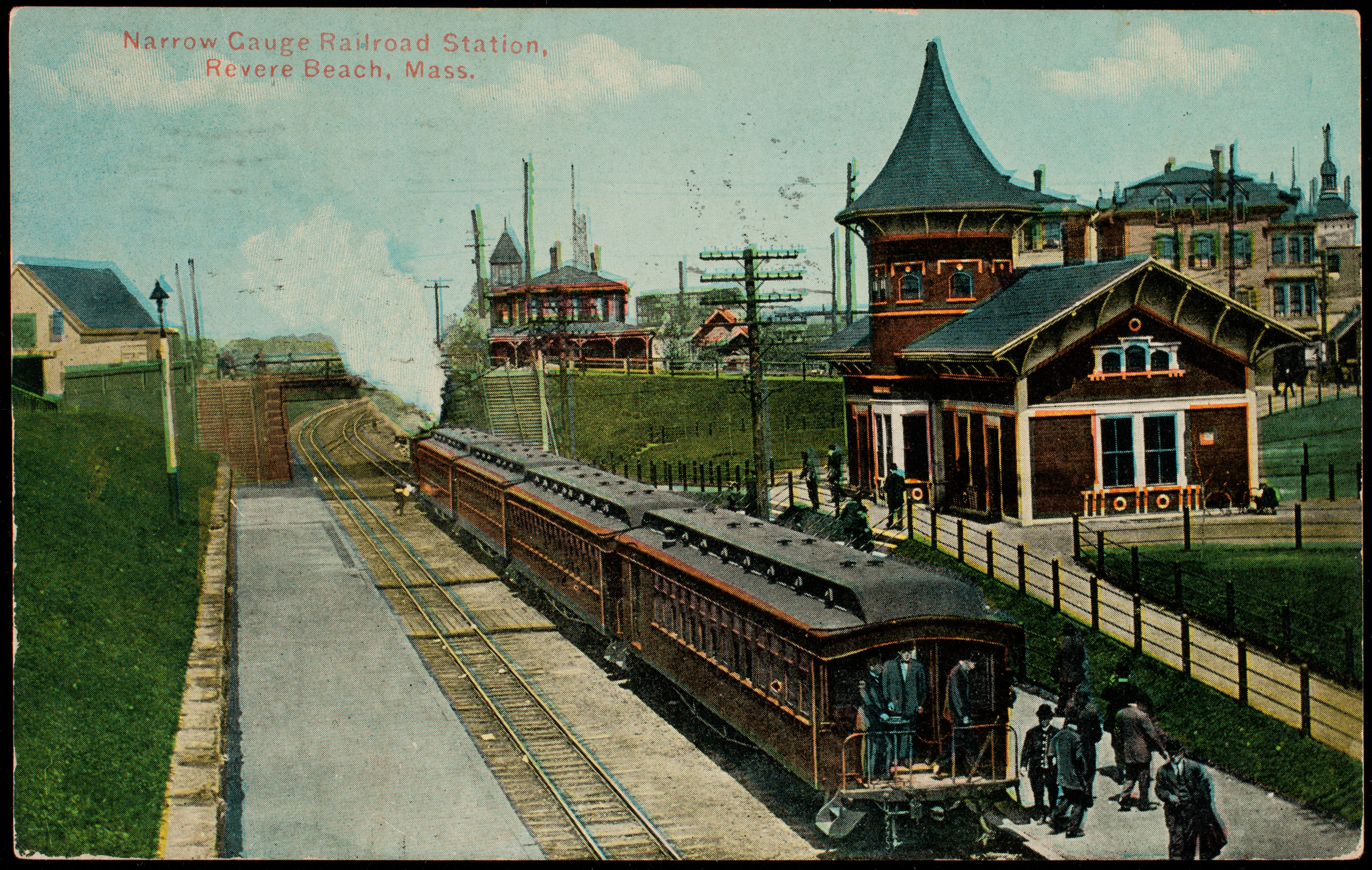
Crescent Beach station on a 1910 postcard

The narrow gauge Boston, Revere Beach and Lynn Railroad (BRB&L) opened from East Boston to Lynn on July 29, 1875. The line ran directly adjacent to the beachfront, a popular summer destination, on the alignment of the modern Revere Beach Boulevard. Revere station at Beach Street was among the initial stations. The station was renamed Pavilion in the late 1870s and Crescent Beach in 1884.

The Eastern Railroad-backed Boston, Winthrop, and Shore Railroad (BW&S) operated slightly inland in 1884 and 1885, with its own Crescent Beach station just west of the BRB&L station. A new BRB&L station was opened on October 31, 1887. It was located at Centennial Street, about 500 feet (150 m) south of the previous location. It was very similar in design to Chatham station – which opened the same year – with a polygonal tower on the track side of the building.

In April 1897, the BRB&L was moved inland onto the BW&S right-of-way, with Crescent Beach station relocated to the new alignment. By 1928 the line was electrified, with pre-pay stations - more a rapid transit line than a conventional railroad. However, due to the Great Depression, the BRB&L shut down on January 27, 1940. Crescent Beach station was demolished in the early 1940s.

=== Rapid transit ===
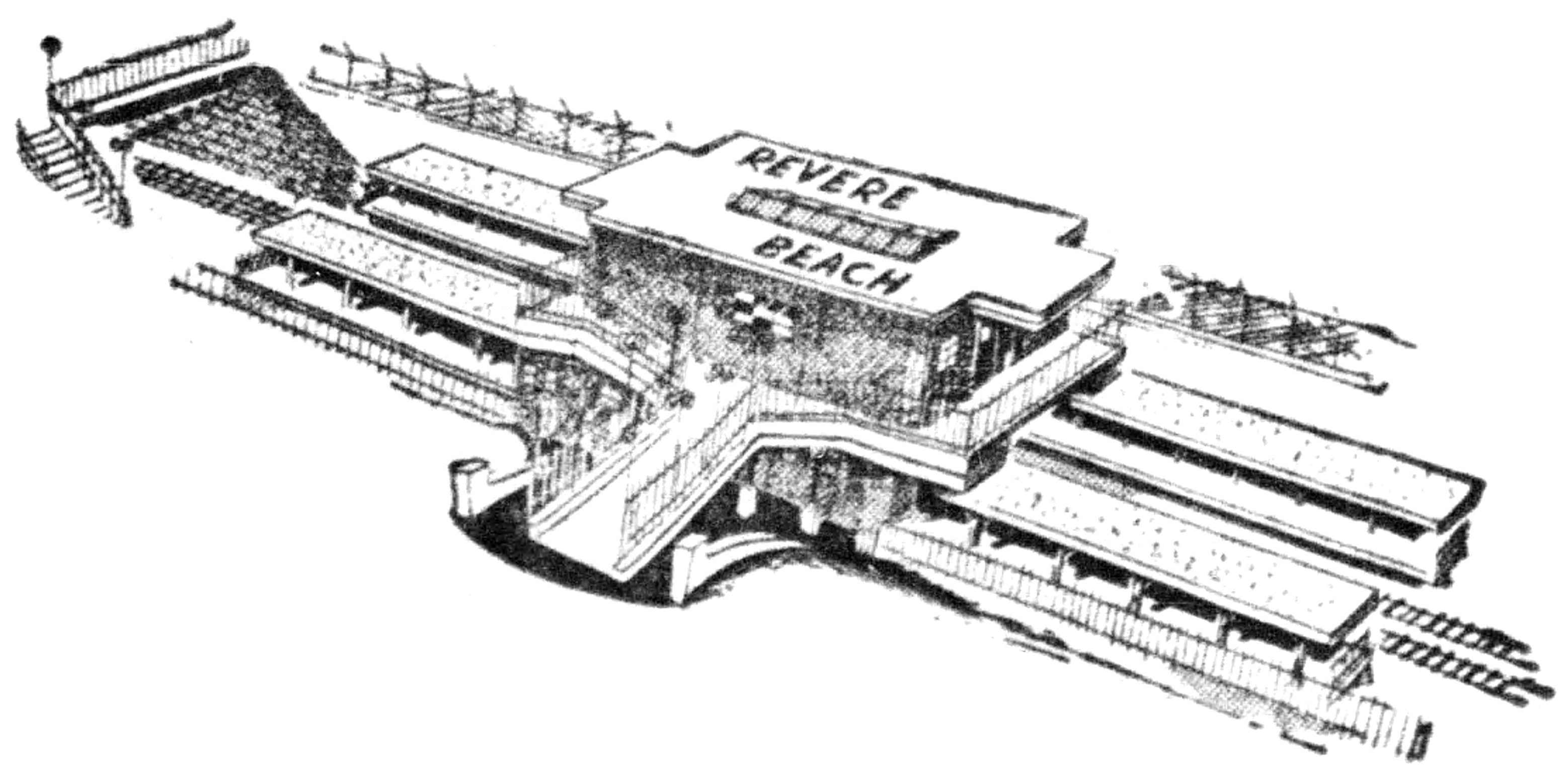
Drawing of the 1954-built station

In 1941, the Boston Elevated Railway bought the BRB&L right of way from Day Square to Revere Beach for use as a high-speed trolley line similar to the Ashmont–Mattapan High-Speed Line; these plans were delayed by the onset of World War II. The 1926 Report on Improved Transportation Facilities and 1945–47 Coolidge Commission Report recommended that the East Boston Tunnel line, which had been converted to rapid transit from streetcars in 1924, be extended to Lynn via the BBRB&L route rather than using it for a trolley line.

In 1947, the newly formed Metropolitan Transit Authority (M.T.A.) decided to build to Lynn as a rapid transit line, and construction began in October 1948. The first part of the Revere Extension opened to Orient Heights in January 1952 and Suffolk Downs in April 1952; the second phase (cut short due to limited funds) opened to Wonderland on June 19, 1954, with intermediate stations at Beachmont and Revere Beach.

=== Renovations ===
Revere Beach station was closed for approximately one year starting on June 25, 1994, as the station was rebuilt along with Suffolk Downs, Beachmont, and Wonderland stations as part of the Blue Line Modernization Program. Blue Line service temporarily ended at Orient Heights and buses served the closed stations during the project Revere Beach station was largely rebuilt at a cost of $9.8 million; it reopened along with the other stations on June 24, 1995.

The station was closed while additional platform repair work was performed from August 2 through 29, 2008.
