= Orient Heights =

Neighborhood of Boston, Massachusetts

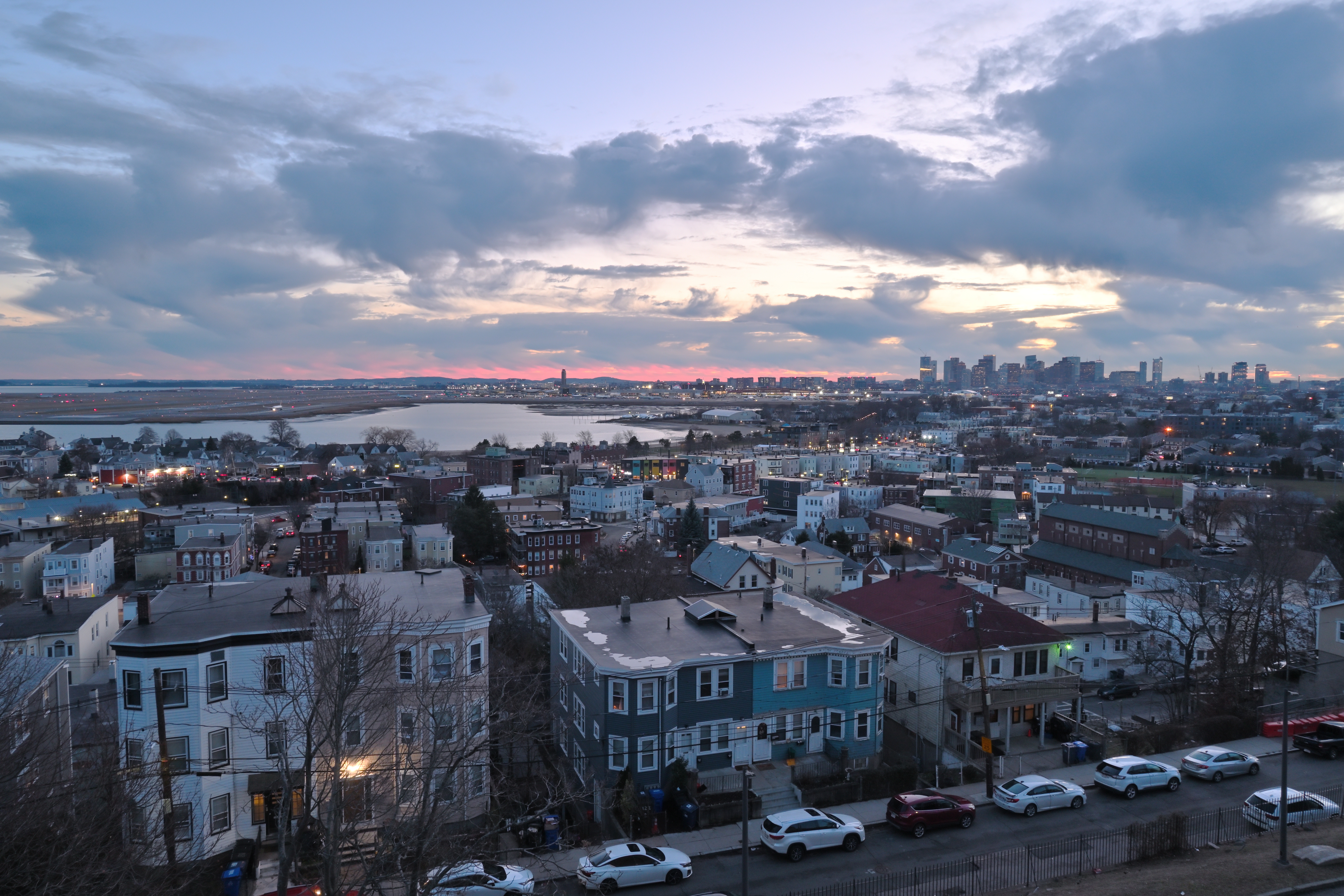
Orient Heights (foreground), with Logan Airport (left and center), Constitution Beach (center), and the Boston skyline (right) in the background

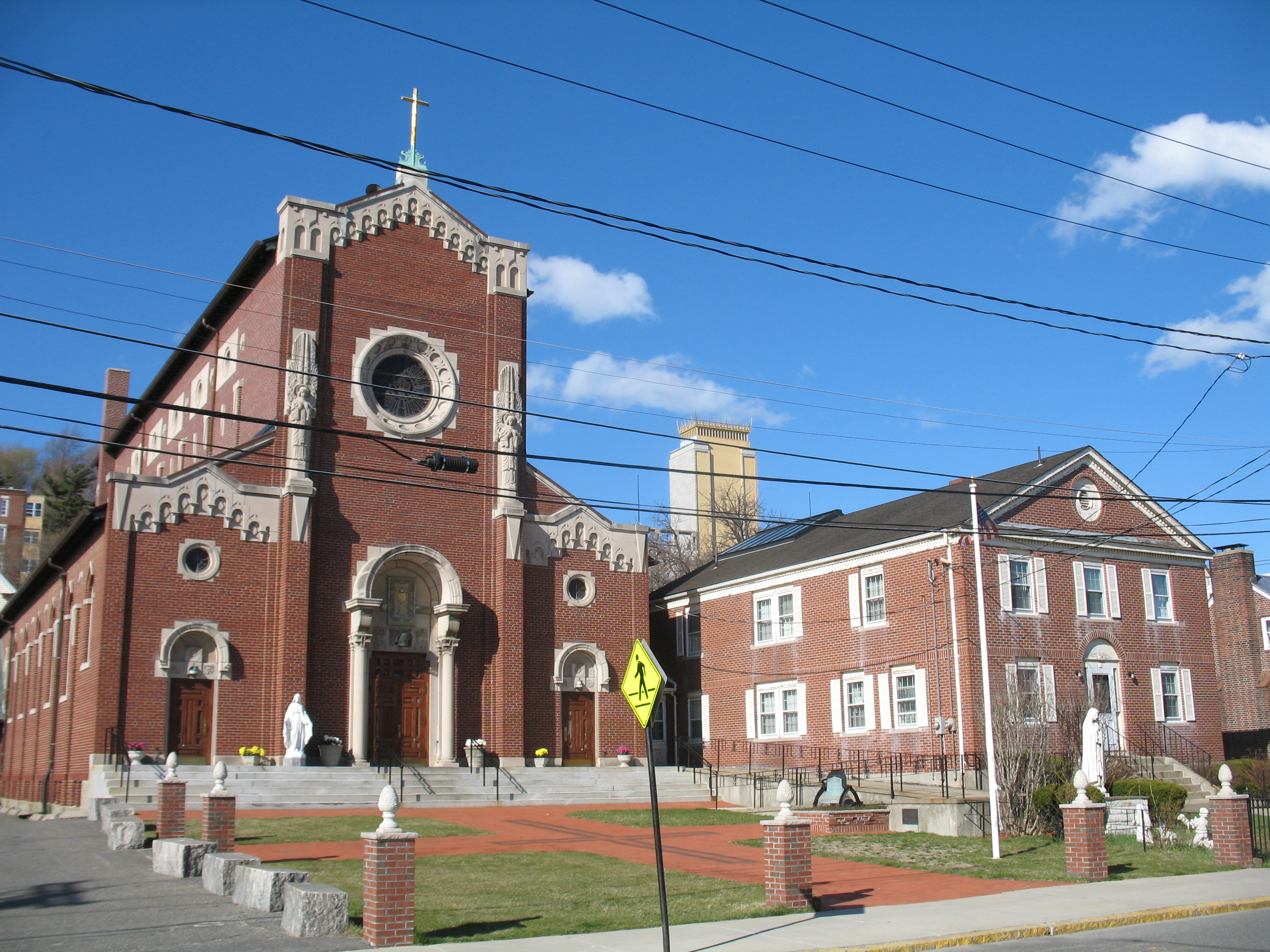
St. Joseph-St. Lazarus Church designed by Matthew Sullivan

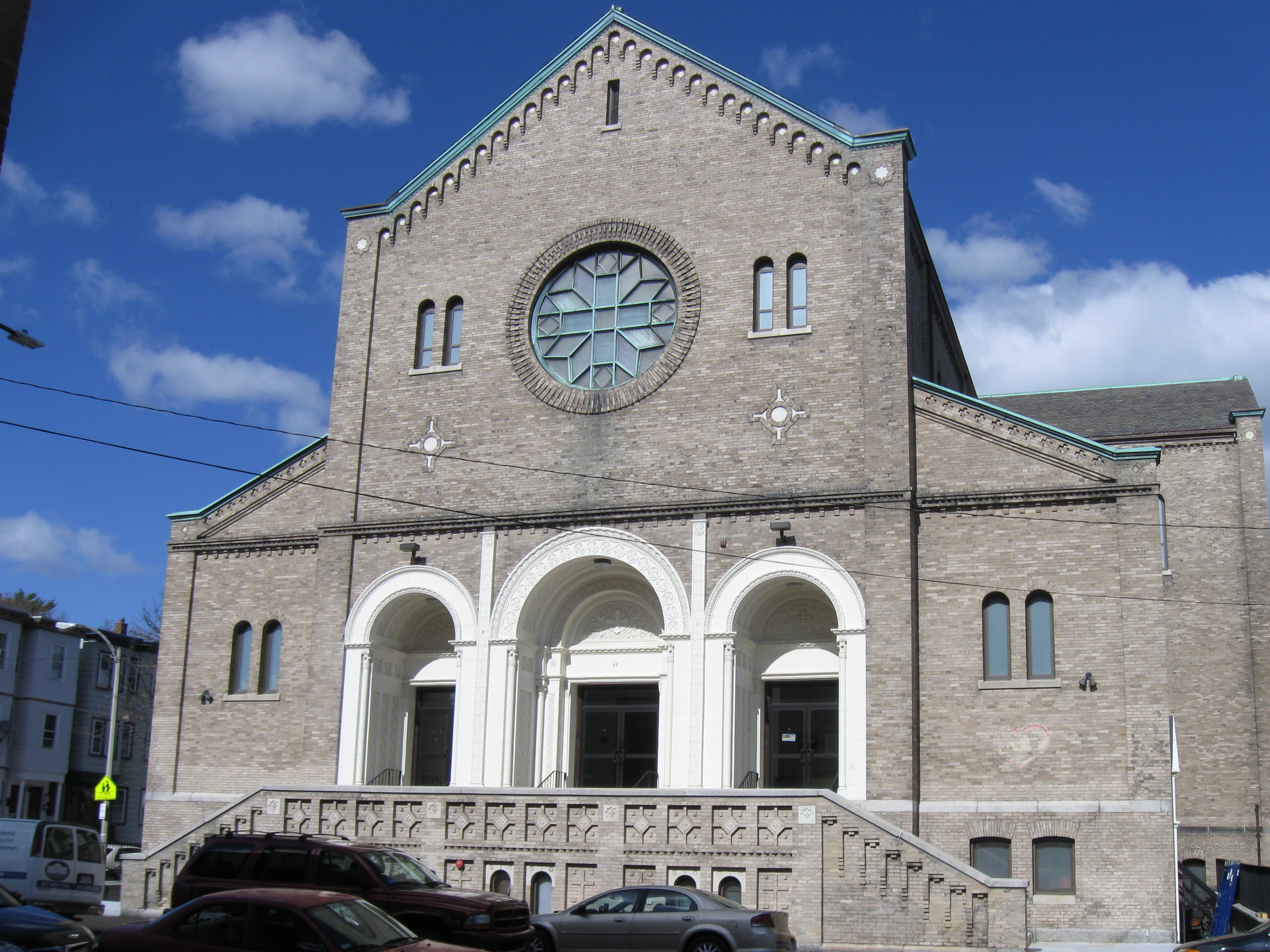
Façade of the Universal Church on Moore Street designed by Franz Joseph Untersee

Orient Heights is a historic section of Boston, Massachusetts, United States, and is commonly considered part of East Boston; it is Boston's northernmost and northeasternmost neighborhood.

The neighborhood sits on a hill, which measures 152 feet in elevation at its highest point. Boston's first Italian immigrants settled on the hill in the 1860s and 1870s, and the neighborhood has remained Italian-dominated since. The main thoroughfare through Orient Heights is Bennington Street, and the principal intersection, Orient Heights Square, is that of Bennington Street and Saratoga Street.

== History ==
The hill of Orient Heights was once called Hog's Island, but was later renamed Breed's Island, not to be confused with Breed's Hill, the location of the Battle of Bunker Hill. The hill was one of the five islands that comprised East Boston prior to its annexation by Boston in 1836.

Well into the 20th century, Italian and English were still spoken in roughly equal amounts in Orient Heights. It is documented that, as recently as the 1950s, masses at St. Lazarus Church (renamed to St. Joseph - St. Lazarus after a merger of parishes) in Orient Heights were delivered by Pastor Luigi Toma in English, Italian and Latin.

In more recent years, an increasing Portuguese-speaking population has appeared, and nearly a third of the residents have South American ancestry.

== Education ==
Two public elementary schools are in the neighborhood; Curtis Guild Elementary on Leyden Street, and Manassah E. Bradley Elementary on Beachview Road.

In 1912, the Boston Public Library opened a second library branch in East Boston, the Orient Heights branch. The branch was closed in the fall of 2013, and the remaining East Boston branch on Bremen Street is the nearest to the neighborhood.

== Landmarks ==
Constitution Beach

One of Boston's more popular public beaches, Constitution Beach, is located in the Orient Heights. It is known to locals as "Shay's Beach." The beach underwent renovations in the late 1990s as a new public bathhouse and refreshment stand was added, as well as a new pedestrian walkway over the tracks of the Blue Line onto Bennington Street.

Historic places

Orient Heights is home to three places on the National Register of Historic Places.

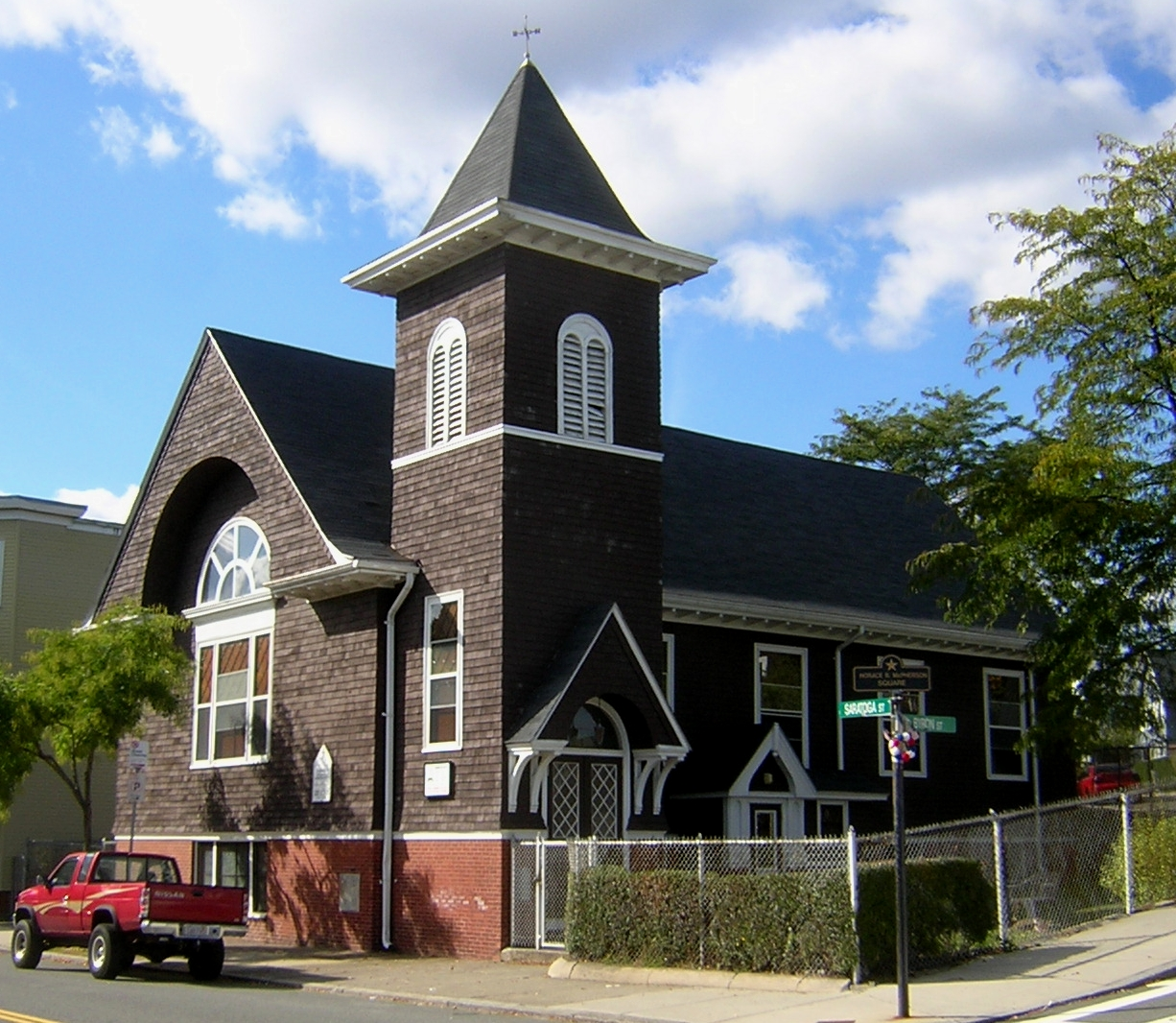
Baker Congregational Church

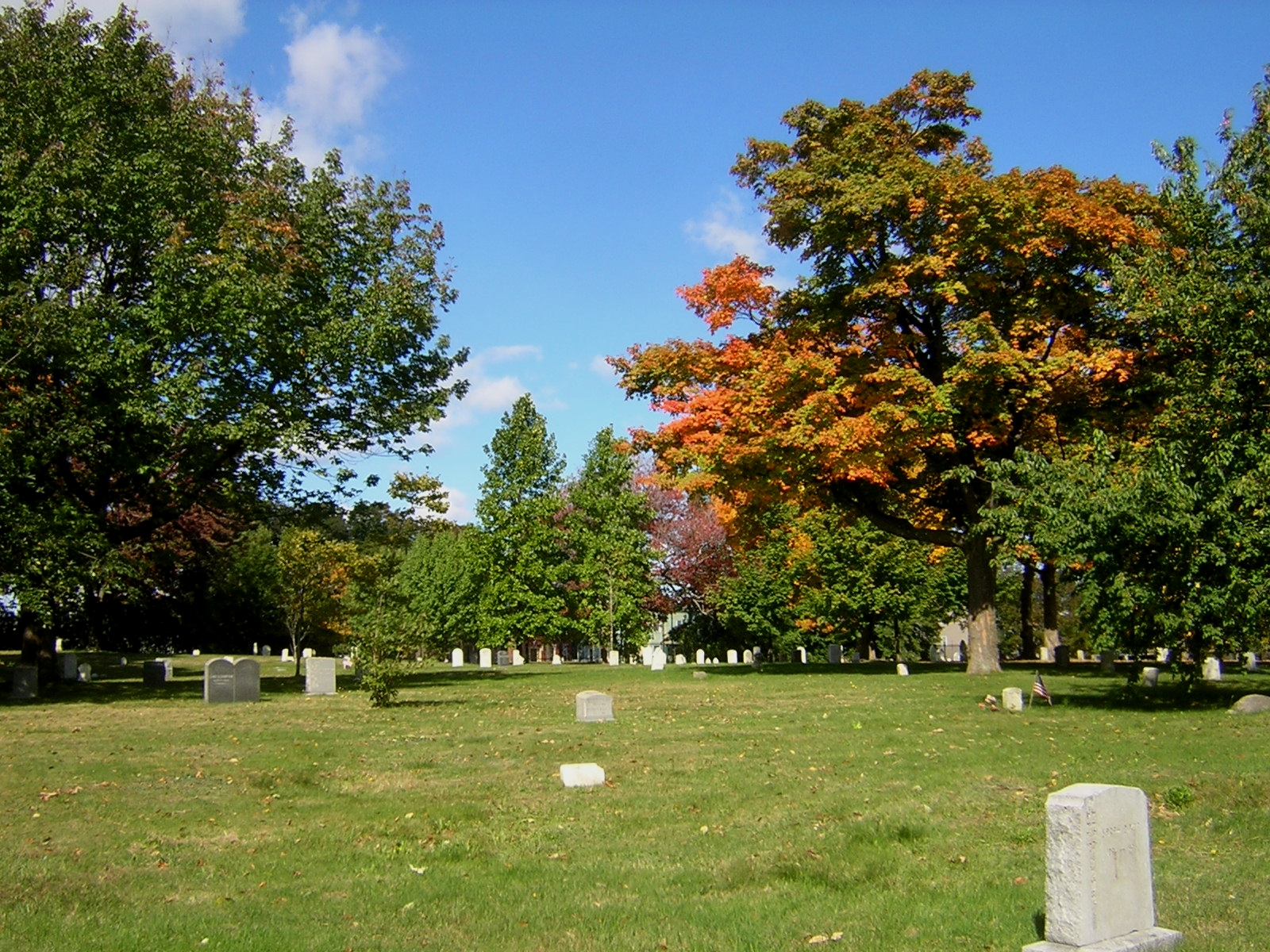
Bennington Street Burying Ground

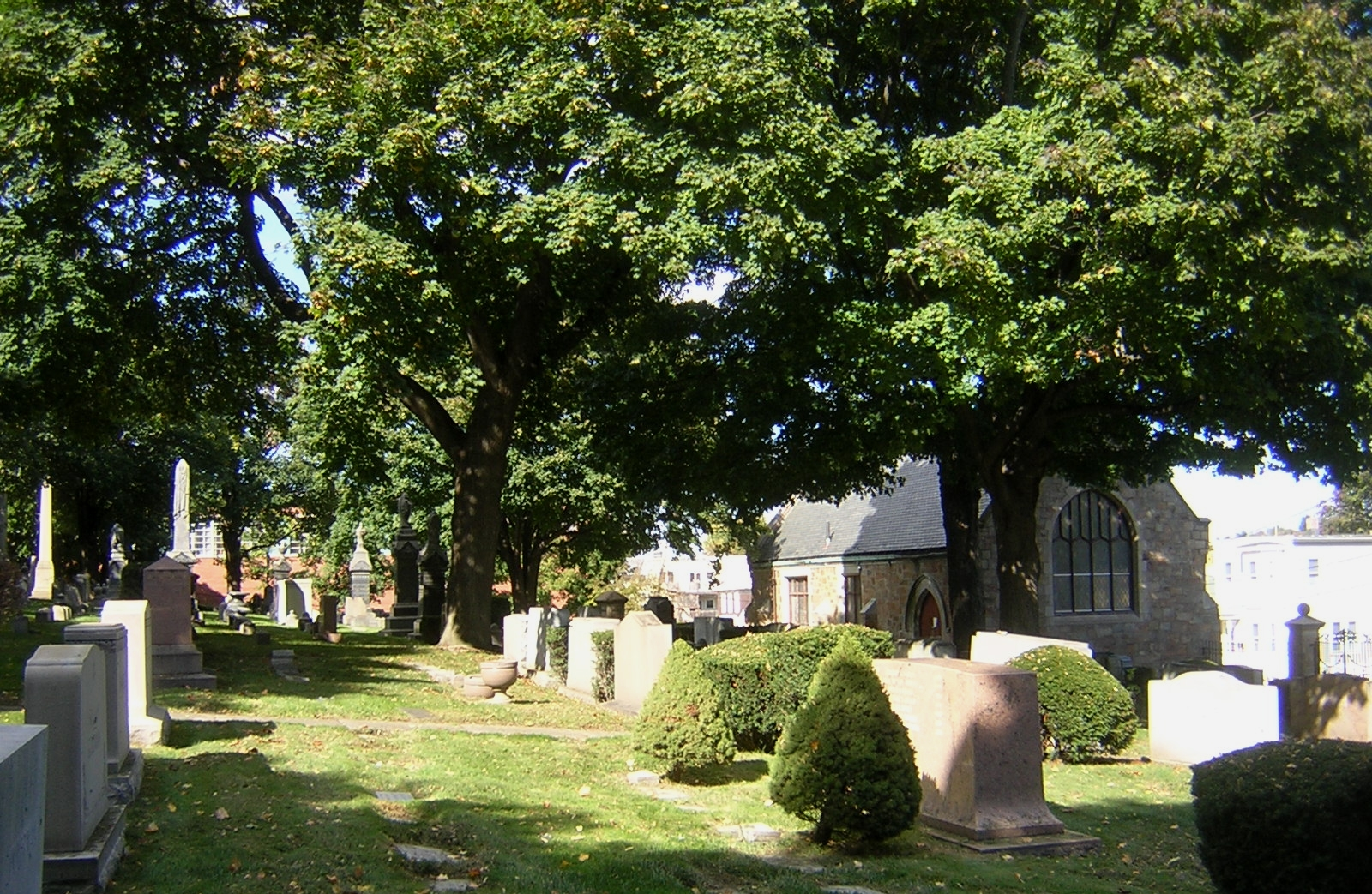
Temple Ohabei Shalom Cemetery

Madonna Shrine

One of the most recognizable landmarks of East Boston is the 35-foot (11 m)-high statue of the Madonna. Atop Orient Heights, it is the national headquarters for the Don Orione order. Constructed in 1956, the statue is a full-size replica of the original statue at the Don Orione Center in the Montemario district of Rome, Italy. It was designed by Jewish-Italian sculptor Arrigo Minerbi, who wanted to show his gratitude to the Catholic Church for having shielded him and his family from the Nazis during World War II. Across the street from the Shrine is the Don Orione Home, a nursing home founded by the Don Orione priests. The chapel was designed by Italian architect Mario Bacciocchi.

The Shrine and Home were led by Fr. Rocco Crescenzi (January 6, 1916 - April 3, 2011), who was sent from Italy for this purpose. Crescenzi had been an errand boy for St. Luigi Orione himself. The nonagenarian Crescenzi was still active at the Home and Shrine at the time of his passing.

Revolutionary War Cross

Atop a hill in Orient Heights sits a large cross. The steel cross on the site today replaced the original wooden cross erected by The Madonna Shrine. It also marks the site of the second battle of the Revolutionary War, the Battle of Chelsea Creek.

== Transportation ==
The Massachusetts Bay Transportation Authority's Blue Line runs through the neighborhood, which is serviced by the Orient Heights and Suffolk Downs stations. Several MBTA bus routes run through the neighborhood; the 120 down Bennington Street between the Orient Heights and Maverick train stations, and the 712 and 713 between the Orient Heights station and Winthrop. No MBTA buses service the Suffolk Downs station, which with the closing of the Suffolk Downs racetrack and a lack of associated bus routes has the lowest ridership of any heavy rail transit station in the MBTA system.
