= Suffolk Downs station =

Metro station in Boston, Massachusetts, US

Suffolk Downs
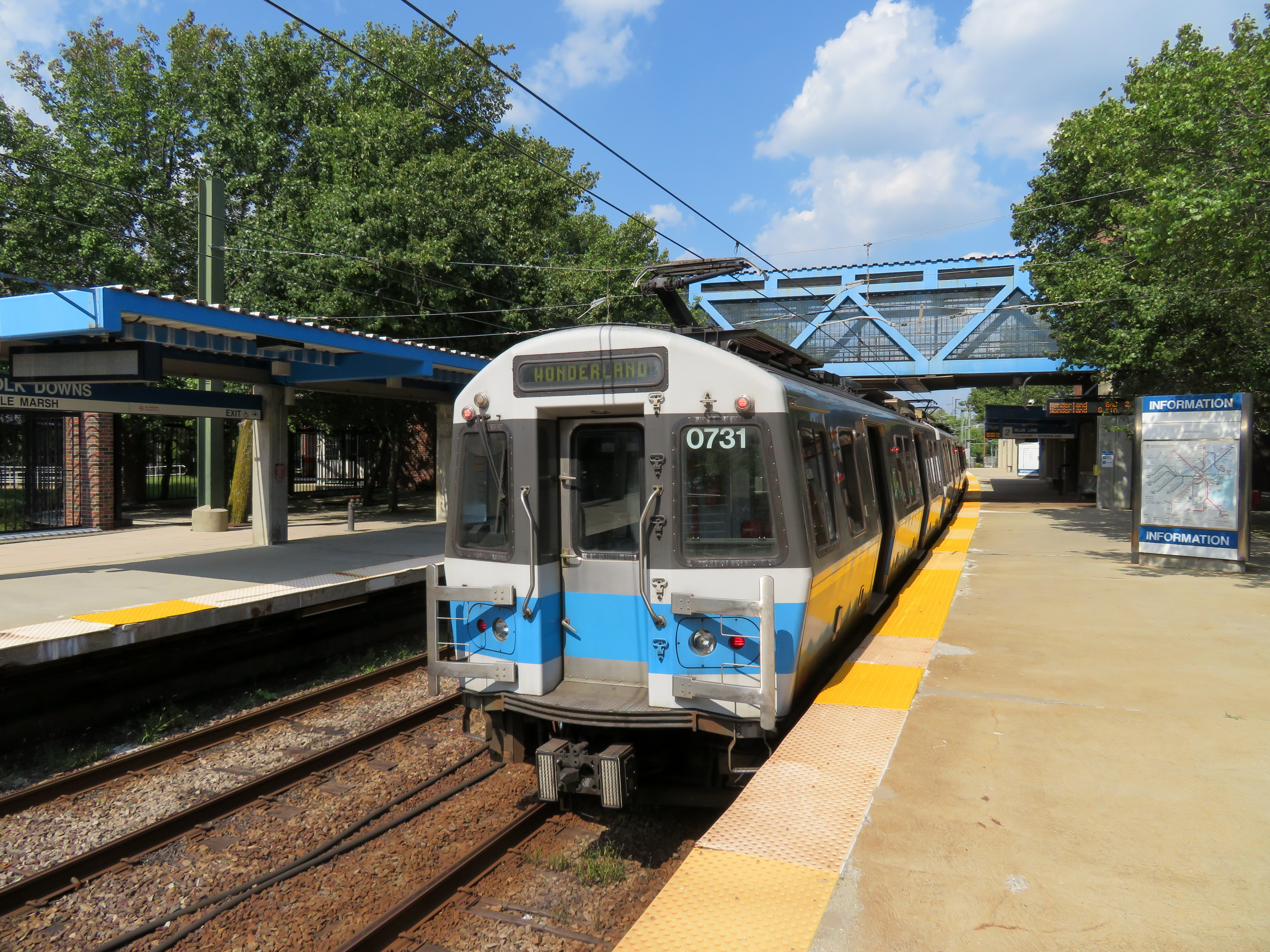
- An outbound train at Suffolk Downs station in August 2018

General information
- Location: 1230 Bennington Street; East Boston, Massachusetts
- Coordinates: 42.39052°N 70.99717°W
- Line: Revere Extension
- Platforms: 2 side platforms
- Tracks: 2

Construction
- Structure type: At grade
- Parking: 108 spaces
- Cycle facilities: Racks available
- Accessible: yes

History
- Opened: April 21, 1952
- Rebuilt: September 17, 1982–January 3, 1984; June 25, 1994–June 24, 1995

Passengers
- FY2019: 521 daily boardings

Services
Preceding station	MBTA	Following station
Orient Heights toward Bowdoin	Blue Line	Beachmont toward Wonderland
Location

Suffolk Downs station is a rapid transit station on the Massachusetts Bay Transportation Authority (MBTA) Blue Line, located on the east side of Orient Heights in East Boston, Massachusetts, United States. It is named for the now-defunct Suffolk Downs racetrack, located just to the north. Suffolk Downs station has two side platforms, with a footbridge structure of brick, concrete, and steel connecting them. The station is accessible. With just 521 daily boardings in FY 2019, Suffolk Downs is the least-used fare-controlled station on the MBTA subway system.

Two previous stations at the site were operated by the Boston, Revere Beach and Lynn Railroad, which opened through East Boston in 1875. The railroad opened Waldemar station in 1894 to serve a nearby development; it was soon renamed Belle Isle. The station closed in the 1920s, but a new station named Suffolk Downs station opened on the site in 1935 to serve the new racetrack. Service on the line ended in 1940. Electric streetcar service on a parallel line operated from 1893 to 1952; a spur line directly to the racetrack was operated from 1935 to 1952.

The Metropolitan Transportation Authority (MTA) purchased the abandoned right-of-way in 1941 to extend the East Boston Tunnel rapid transit line. The MTA opened its Suffolk Downs station with a single platform in 1952; it was expanded with a second platform in 1954 as part of the second phase of the Revere Extension. After a 1976 fire, only the inbound platform remained open until a 1982–1984 renovation. The station was renovated further in 1994–95, and further improvements are planned as part of a redevelopment of the racetrack site.

== Station design ==
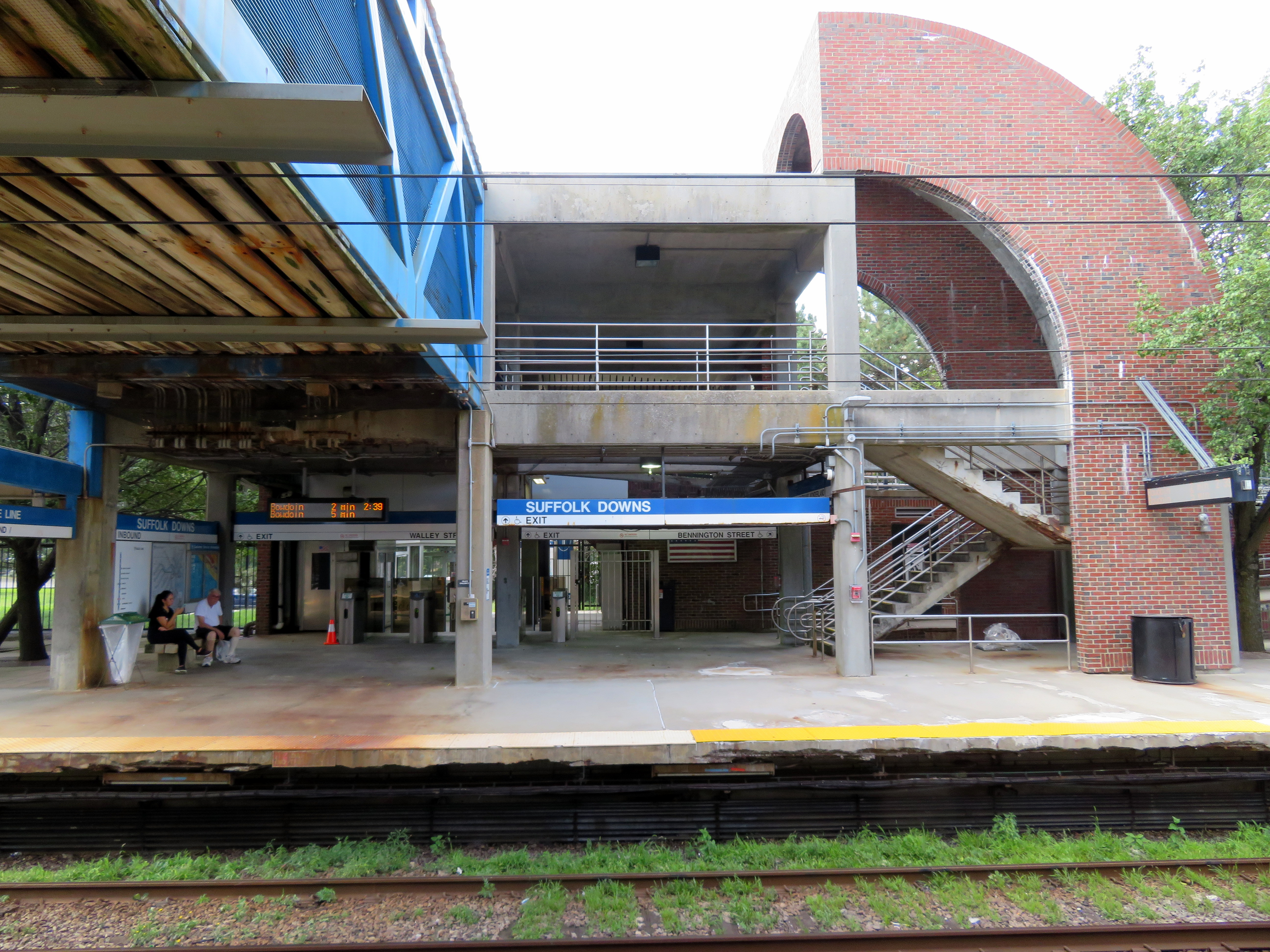
The footbridge structure and inbound platform

Suffolk Downs station is located at the east end of the Orient Heights neighborhood in East Boston. The defunct Suffolk Downs racetrack is to the north, and Belle Isle Marsh Reservation to the south and east. The surface-level station has two side platforms serving the two tracks of the Blue Line.

The dominant architectural form of the station is the symmetrical footbridge structure designed by architect Eduardo Lozano. The structure has a hierarchy of three materials: "neutral" concrete supports the footbridge and provides shelter for passengers, warmer brick covers exterior faces and some interior walls, and the blue-painted steel footbridge "echoes the metallic technology of the railroad". The bridge is divided into separate paid and unpaid corridors; both halves have ramps (but no elevators) for accessibility, while the paid half also has stairs to the platforms.

The station was designed as a "transparent fortress", as the MBTA's primary design consideration was security. Open forms provide cover for passengers, but allow the single station agent or a police officer outside to surveil the whole station. The architect called it "a proxy for a building". The design was inspired by medieval fortified churches, with battered walls to discourage climbing and iron palisades to separate paid and unpaid areas. The brick arches were partially medieval in design – and partially just the architect's preference.

The station has entrances from Bennington Street and Walley Street. Due to low ridership, there are only fare gates on the Walley Street (inbound) side; the outbound side only has a high exit turnstile. Passengers must use the unpaid portion of the footbridge to enter from Bennington Street, and the paid portion to reach the outbound platform. A 108-space parking lot is located on the Bennington Street side north of the entrance.

== History ==
=== BRB&L and streetcars ===
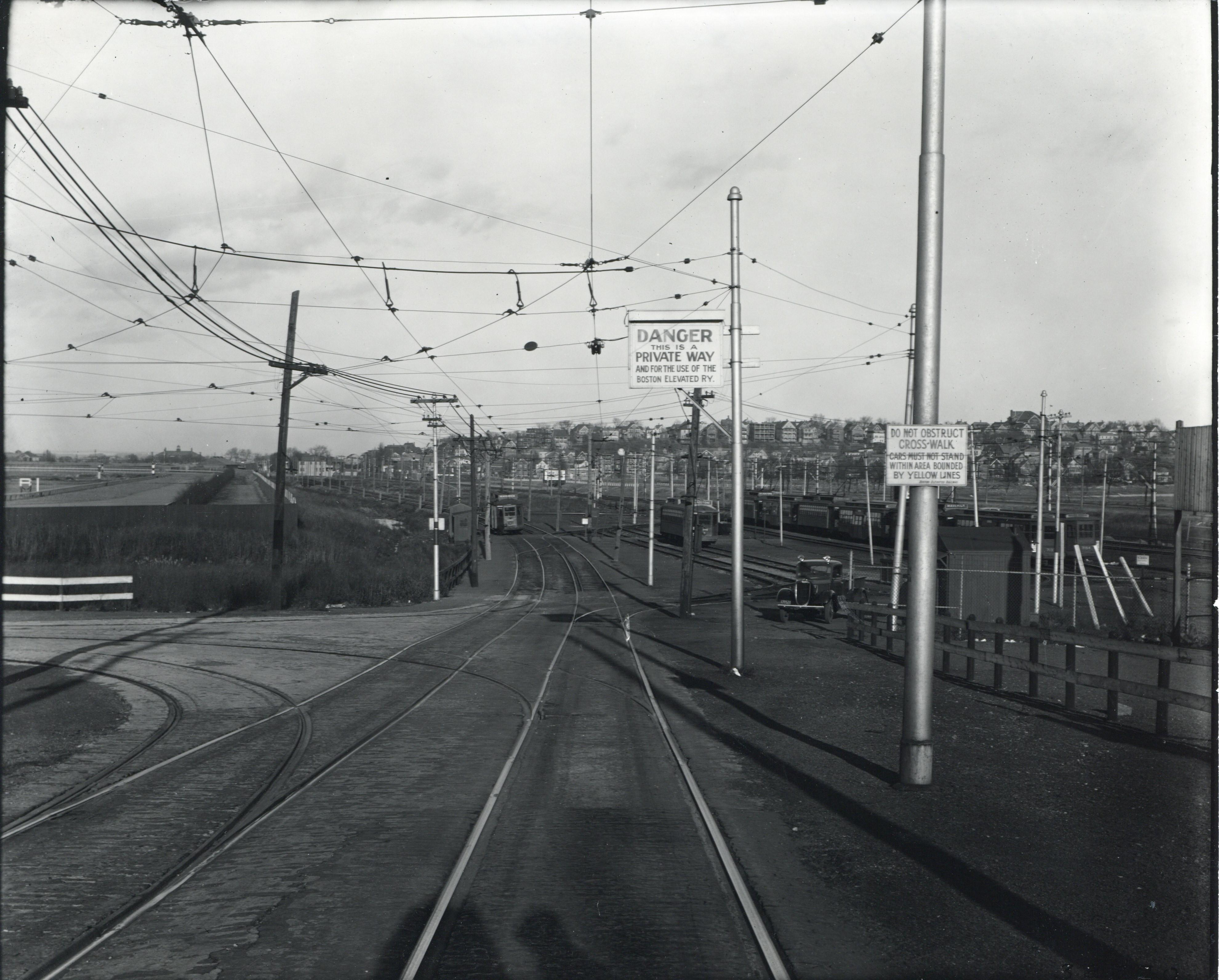
Gladstone Loop and the junction for the Suffolk Downs spur in the 1930s

The narrow gauge Boston, Revere Beach and Lynn Railroad (BRB&L) opened from East Boston to Lynn through Breed's Hill (later part of East Boston) on July 29, 1875; there was initially no station between Winthrop and Beachmont. Waldemar station opened in 1894 to serve a new housing development on Orient Heights. It was renamed Belle Isle within several years. The development failed in 1907, but the station remained open. The station closed in the mid-1920s. The wooden structure suffered a number of fires in 1925 and 1926 caused by sparks from passing locomotives.

On July 4, 1889, the Boston and Revere Electric Street Railway opened a new electric streetcar line from Winthrop Junction to Crescent Beach, running on a private right-of-way that paralleled the BRB&L tracks on the north side. It was initially only used for seasonal service to the Great Ocean Pier, which closed in 1893; the Lynn and Boston Street Railway began operating the line full-time on July 17, 1893. The line passed through several successor companies; by the 1930s, the Eastern Massachusetts Street Railway and the Boston Elevated Railway (BERy) jointly operated Maverick–Revere Beach through service. In 1930, the BERy constructed a small yard, Gladstone Loop, north of Waldemar Avenue near the former Belle Isle station. It served as the terminal for Maverick–Gladstone Loop short turns and had a small shelter for inbound passengers.

In 1928, the BRB&L was electrified with pre-pay stations, making it more like a rapid transit line than a conventional railroad. A new station, Suffolk Downs, was built at the former Belle Isle site when the horse-racing track opened in July 1935. The Boston Elevated Railway also opened a streetcar spur from Gladstone Loop to the track. On June 10, 1936, the Eastern Massachusetts Street Railway sold its remaining streetcar lines in Chelsea, Everett, and Revere to the BERy. Due to the Great Depression, the BRB&L shut down on January 27, 1940. Suffolk Downs station was sold to a private owner after the closure.

=== Rapid transit ===
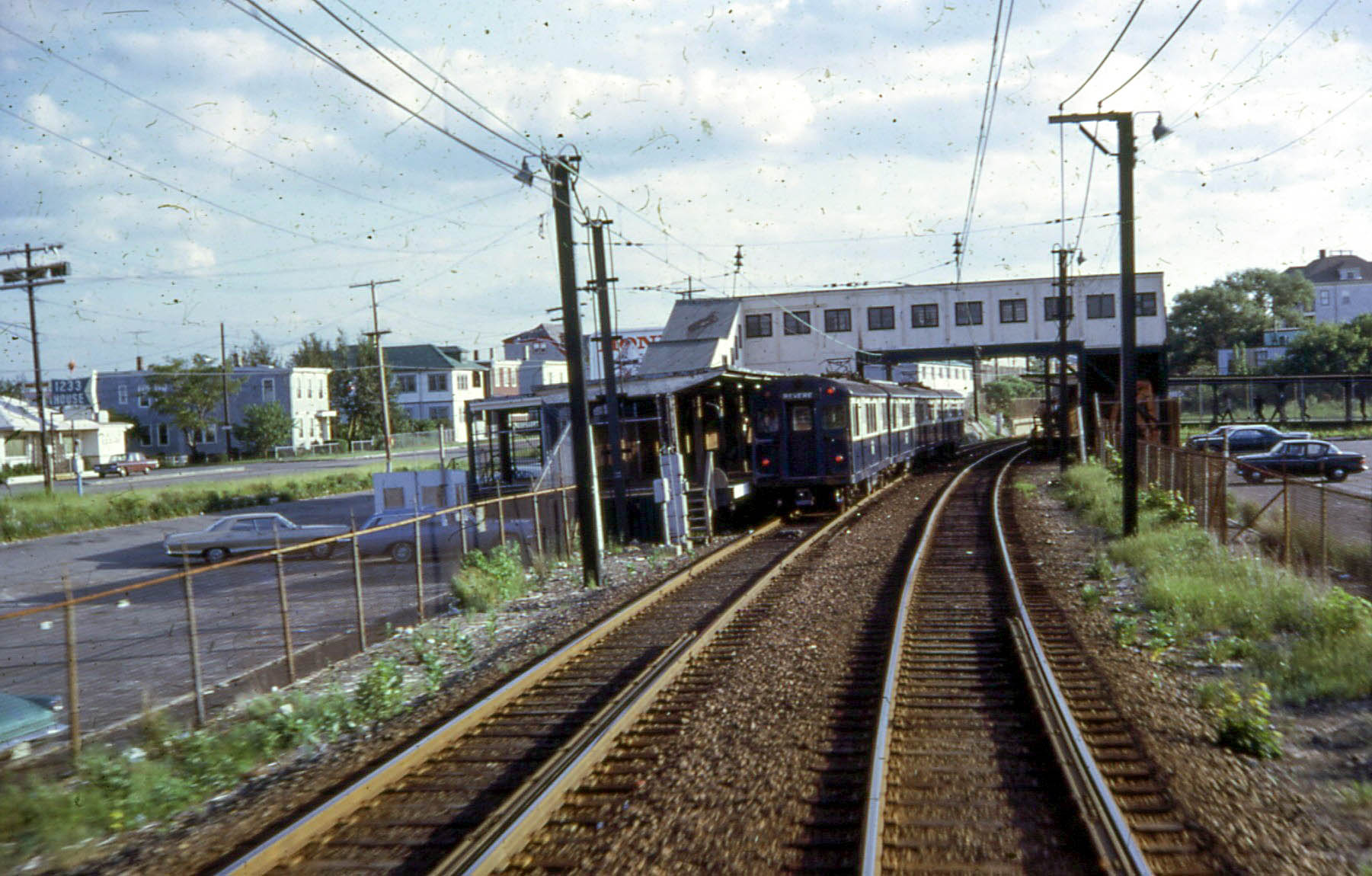
An eastbound train at Suffolk Downs station in 1967

In 1941, the Boston Elevated Railway bought the BRB&L right of way from Day Square to Revere Beach for use as a high-speed streetcar line similar to the Ashmont–Mattapan High-Speed Line. These plans were delayed by the onset of World War II. However, the 1926 Report on Improved Transportation Facilities and 1945–47 Coolidge Commission Report recommended that the East Boston Tunnel line, which had been converted to rapid transit from streetcars in 1924, be extended to Lynn via the BRB&L right-of-way, rather than using the right-of-way for a streetcar line.

In 1947, the newly formed Metropolitan Transit Authority (MTA) decided to build the extension to Lynn as a rapid transit line. Construction began in October 1948. The first part of the Revere Extension opened to Orient Heights on January 5, 1952. The remaining streetcar lines in East Boston, Chelsea, and Revere were replaced with trackless trolleys at that time. The new Orient Heights–Revere Beach Loop line ran on Bennington Street south of the former BRB&L alignment. There was no replacement for the Suffolk Downs streetcar spur.

A one-stop rapid transit extension to Suffolk Downs station opened on April 21, 1952 – the first day of the racing season. The station initially had only one track and one platform, and was only open during the racing season. A rapid transit spur directly to the racetrack was considered, but was rejected due to cost. However, the MTA reactivated the Suffolk Downs spur, running a streetcar shuttle to the track until the racing season ended on June 28. This shuttle was not resumed for the 1953 season. Most of the streetcar trackage was later removed, though the switches to the Suffolk Downs spur and a short segment on Walley Street remain extant. The former BRB&L station was demolished in May 1952.

The second phase of the Revere Extension (cut short due to limited funds) opened to Wonderland on June 19, 1954, with a second track and platform added to Suffolk Downs station for full-time service. Because Suffolk Downs station was expected to be used primarily during the short racing season, the platforms were constructed of wood rather than the concrete used in the other stations. The Orient Heights–Revere Beach trackless trolley line was rendered redundant by the extension to Wonderland and was discontinued on June 18, 1955, ending bus service to the station. The Massachusetts Bay Transportation Authority (MBTA) replaced the MTA in August 1964. The subway lines were given colored identifying names in 1965, with the East Boston Tunnel route becoming the Blue Line.

=== Renovations ===
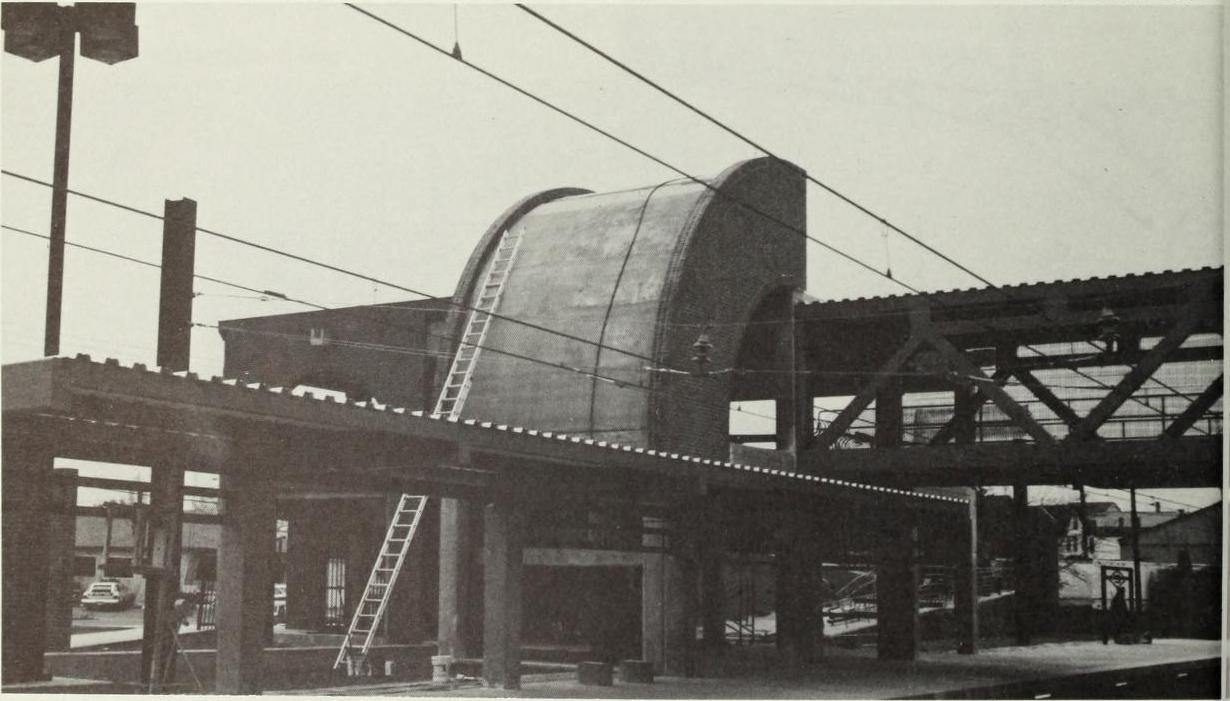
Construction of the new station in 1983

A fire on February 14, 1976 destroyed much of the wooden station. Only the inbound platform remained open after the fire, which hurt attendance at races. From February 1 to December 16, 1981, Sunday service between Orient Heights and Wonderland was replaced by shuttle buses due to budget cuts. The MBTA received a $1.9 million grant from the Urban Mass Transportation Administration to fund a new station, and a $2.5 million construction contract was awarded on August 27, 1982. Construction began on September 17, but was soon suspended until March 1983 due to winter conditions. The station closed for reconstruction in 1983, and the new station fully opened on January 3, 1984. It was designed for security and easy surveillance, with nonflammable materials to avoid a repeat of the 1976 fire. Suffolk Downs was the first accessible station on the Blue Line, and the only accessible station on the line until renovations to State finished in 1987.

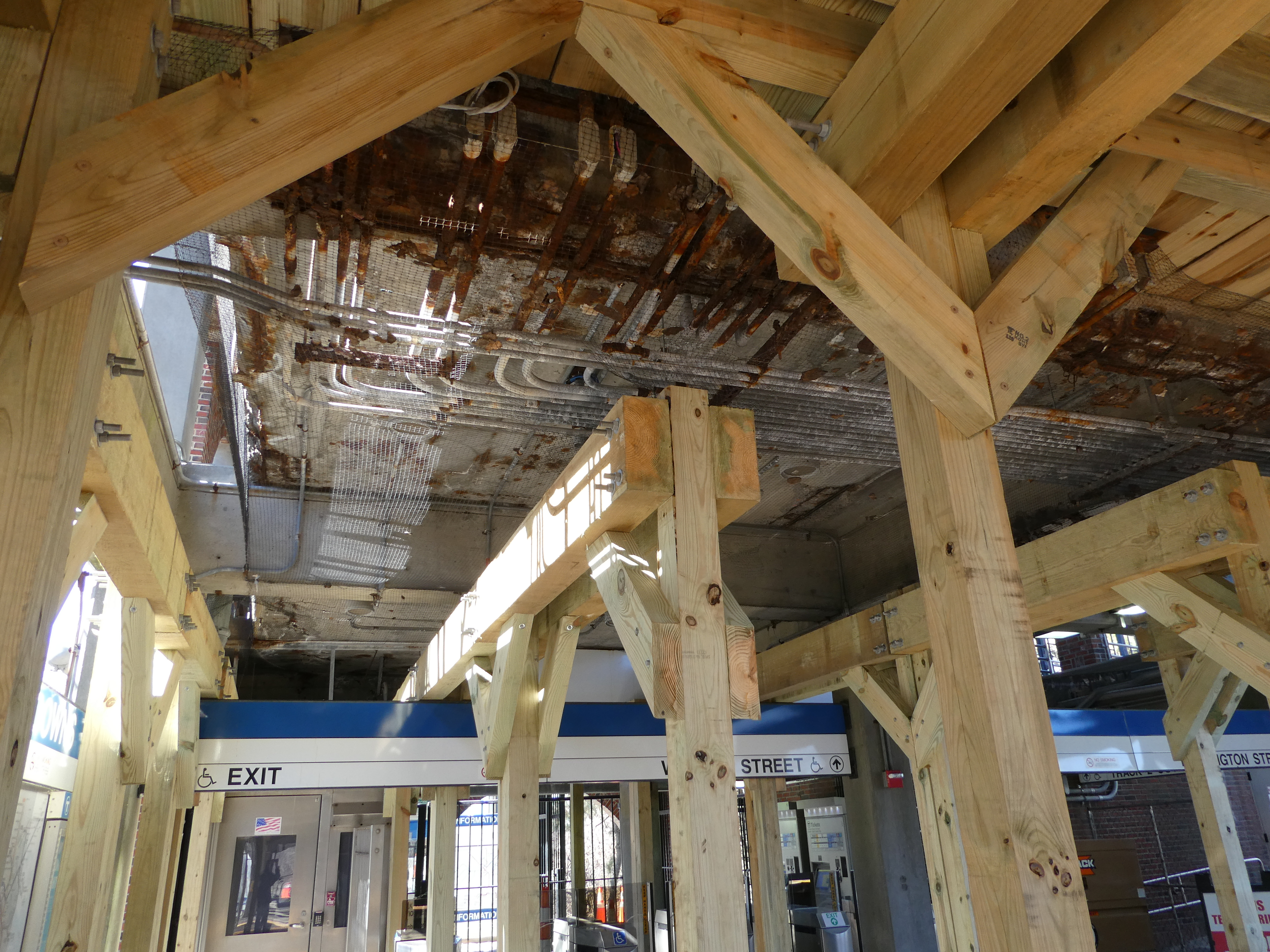
Wooden bracing under the closed footbridge in 2022

The station was closed for one year starting on June 25, 1994 as Suffolk Downs, Beachmont, Revere Beach, and Wonderland stations were rebuilt as part of the Blue Line Modernization Program. Blue Line service temporarily ended at Orient Heights and buses served the closed outer stations during the project. Because Suffolk Downs station had been completely rebuilt just decade before, it needed just $3 million worth of work, compared to $9 million each at Revere Beach and Wonderland and $27 million for a completely new station at Beachmont. The inbound platform was extended 100 feet (30 m) to the south, and the outbound platform an equal length to the north. The stations reopened on June 24, 1995.

Unlike most MBTA rapid transit stations, Suffolk Downs has no direct MBTA bus connections; the nearest route is the 120 about 700 feet (210 m) to the southwest. However, during the 2013 reconstruction and closure of Orient Heights, Suffolk Downs was used as the terminus of the replacement shuttle bus service. The footbridge was closed on March 22, 2021, due to structural deterioration, but the station remained open. Passengers needing to cross between platforms had to take a train one stop to Orient Heights or Beachmont. The footbridge deck was replaced during closure of the outer portion of the Blue Line from May 22 to June 8, 2022. The footbridge reopened in October 2022.

Averaging just 521 daily boardings in FY 2019, Suffolk Downs is the least-used fare-controlled station on the MBTA subway system. The redevelopment of the Suffolk Downs site is expected to substantially increase ridership to Suffolk Downs and Beachmont stations. The developer, HYM Investment Group, has committed $20 million for transit projects including modifications to both stations. By 2022, reconstruction of the station was expected to begin between FY 2023 and FY 2027. Conceptual design began in mid-2022. As of July 2025, the MBTA plans to replace two staircases in the station by 2026.
