= Wonderland station =

Rapid transit station in Revere, Massachusetts, US

Wonderland
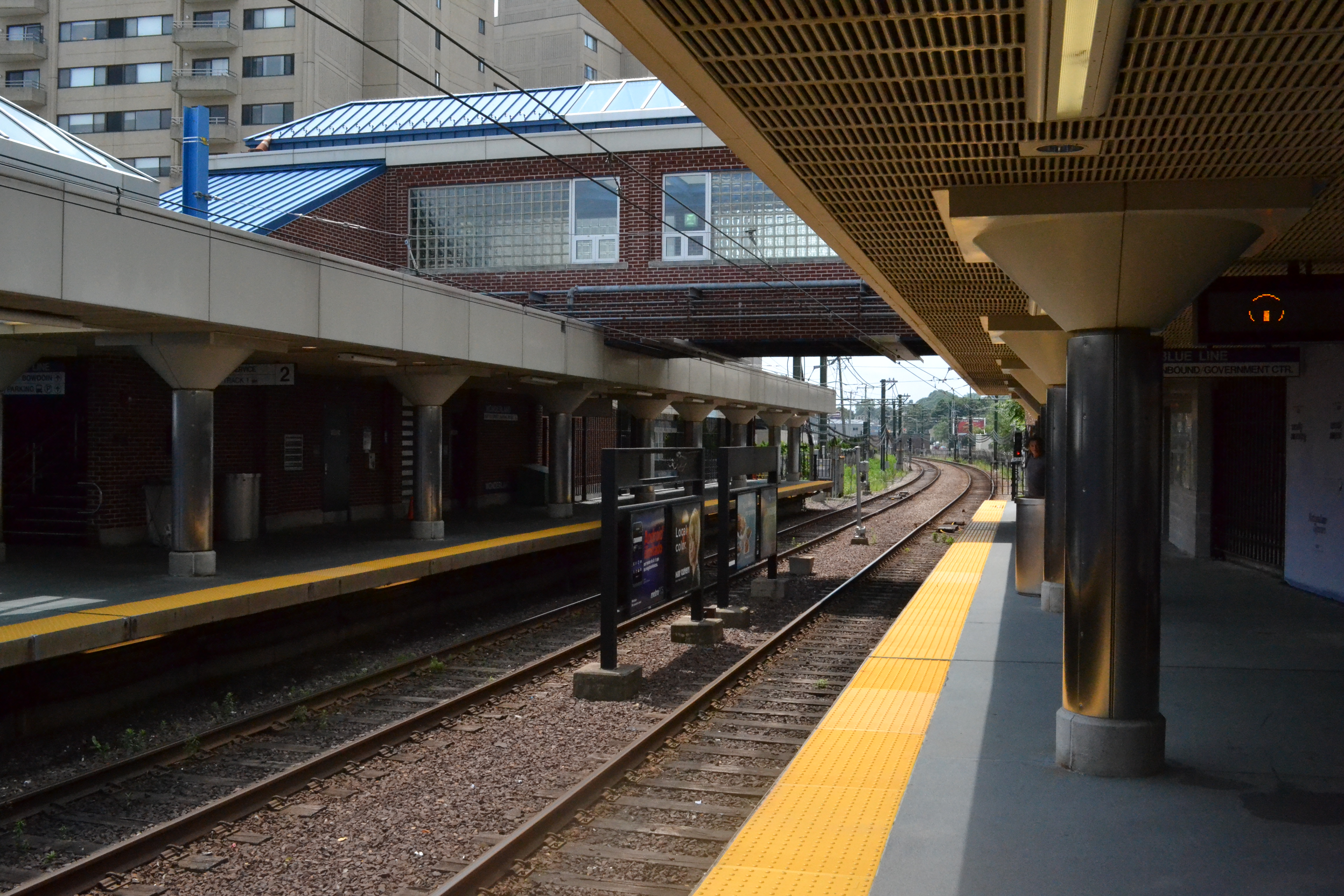
- Wonderland station in July 2012

General information
- Location: 1300 North Shore Road (Route 1A); Revere, Massachusetts
- Coordinates: 42.4134°N 70.9917°W
- Line: Revere Extension
- Platforms: 2 side platforms
- Tracks: 2
- Connections: MBTA bus: 110, 116, 411, 424, 426W, 439, 441, 442, 450W, 455

Construction
- Structure type: At grade
- Parking: 1,862 spaces (37 accessible)
- Cycle facilities: 24 spaces; "Pedal and Park" bicycle cage
- Accessible: yes

History
- Opened: June 19, 1954
- Rebuilt: June 25, 1994–June 24, 1995; July 2008; June 30, 2012
- Former names: Bath House (BRB&L)

Passengers
- FY2019: 6,866 daily boardings

Services
Preceding station	MBTA	Following station
Revere Beach toward Bowdoin	Blue Line	Terminus
Proposed services
Preceding station	MBTA	Following station
Revere Beach toward Charles/MGH	Blue Line	River Works toward Lynn
Location

Wonderland station (officially the Wonderland Intermodal Transit Center) is a transit station in Revere, Massachusetts located adjacent to Revere Beach. It is the northern terminus of the MBTA Blue Line rapid transit line, as well as a major bus transfer station for Revere and the North Shore area, serving MBTA bus routes 110, 116, 411, 424, 426W, 439, 441, 442, 450W, and 455. The station is fully accessible.

A previous station, Bath House, was open near the site on the Boston, Revere Beach and Lynn Railroad from approximately 1900 to 1940. Wonderland station opened in January 1954. It was rebuilt in 1995, repaired in 2008, and upgraded with a large parking garage and pedestrian bridge in 2012.

== History ==
=== BRB&L ===
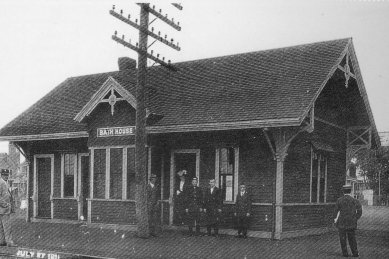
Bath House station, probably in 1921

The narrow-gauge Boston, Revere Beach and Lynn Railroad (BRB&L) opened from East Boston to Lynn on July 29, 1875. The line ran directly adjacent to the beachfront, a popular summer destination, on the alignment of the modern Revere Beach Boulevard. The Eastern Railroad opened its Chelsea Beach Branch in 1881 along the modern Blue Line corridor slightly inland. A third line - the Boston, Winthrop, and Shore Railroad - shared the Chelsea Beach Branch alignment in 1884–5. None of the three railroads initially stopped at the modern station site, which was then an unpopulated swampy area. The BRB&L had a stop named Atlantic (later renamed as Revere Street) at Revere Street some 2,000 feet (610 m) to the north of the modern station site from the beginning of its operations; the other railroads may have briefly had Revere Street stops as well.

The Chelsea Beach Branch, which operated only during the summer, ended operations in 1891, although the rails remained in place until the 1920s. In April 1897, the BRB&L was moved inland onto the modern right-of-way next to the abandoned Chelsea Beach Branch. A new station, Bath House, was soon built on the east side of the tracks across from the new Revere Beach Bath House, just north of the modern station site. By 1928 the line was electrified, with pre-pay stations - more a rapid transit line than a conventional railroad. However, due to the Great Depression, the BRB&L shut down on January 27, 1940.

=== M.T.A. and MBTA ===
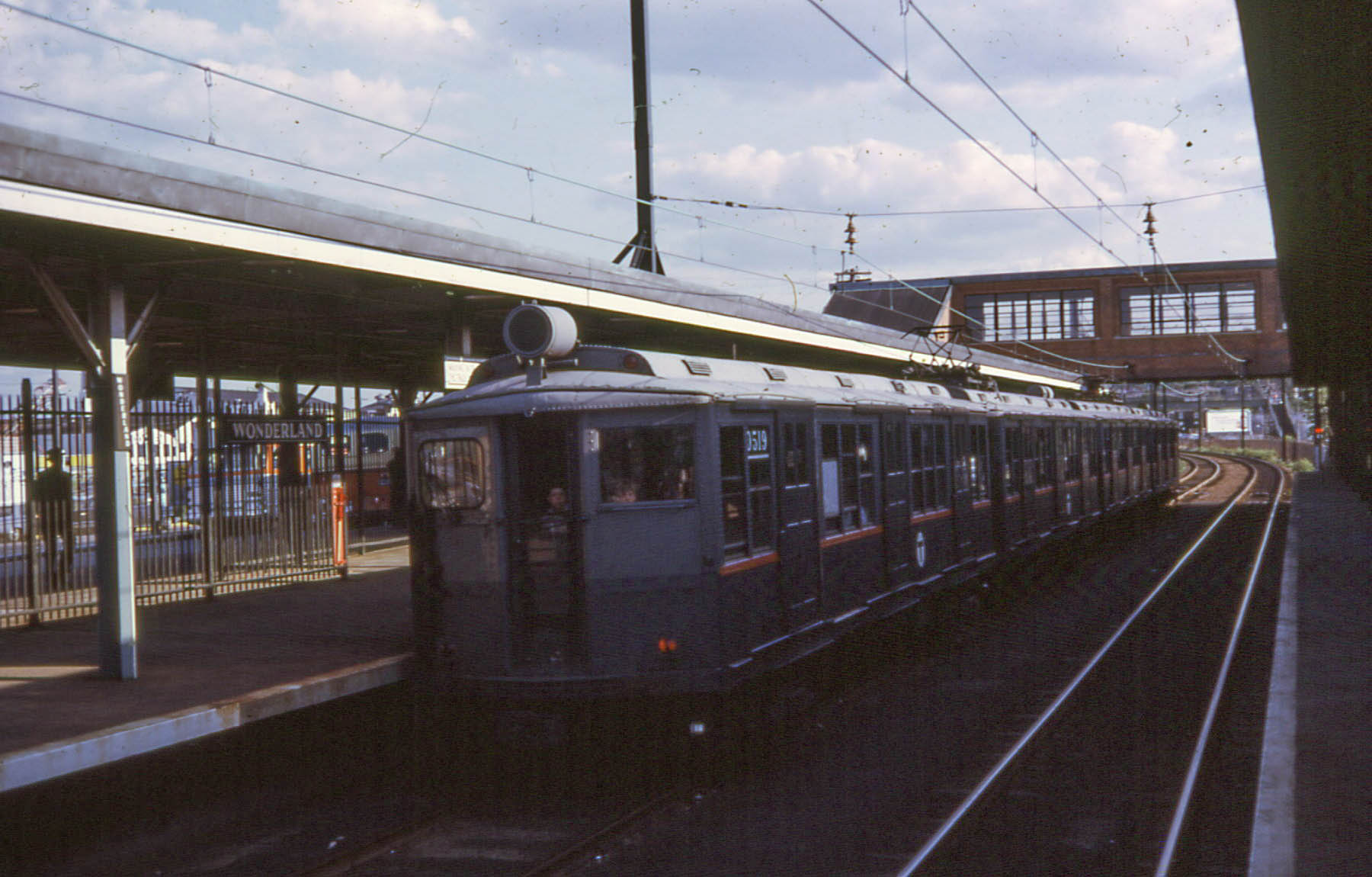
A Blue Line train at Wonderland in 1967

In 1941, the Boston Elevated Railway bought the BRB&L right of way from Day Square to Revere Beach for use as a high-speed trolley line similar to the Ashmont–Mattapan High-Speed Line; these plans were delayed by the onset of World War II. The 1926 Report on Improved Transportation Facilities and 1945–1947 Coolidge Commission Report recommended that the East Boston Tunnel line, which had been converted to rapid transit from streetcars in 1924, be extended to Lynn via the BBRB&L route rather than using it for a trolley line.

In 1947, the newly formed Metropolitan Transit Authority (M.T.A.) decided to build to Lynn as a rapid transit line, and construction began in October 1948. The first part of the Revere Extension opened to Orient Heights in January 1952 and Suffolk Downs in April 1952; the second phase (cut short due to limited funds) opened to Wonderland on June 19, 1954, with intermediate stations at Beachmont and Revere Beach. Wonderland was originally to be named Bath House after the former station, but instead was named after the now-closed Wonderland Greyhound Park, itself named after Wonderland Amusement Park, which operated at the site from 1906 to 1911.

The Wonderland Blue Line terminus station has been in mostly continuous operation since 1954; however, service has been interrupted several times due to weather and construction. It was closed for flood damage from February 6 to March 13, 1978, after the Blizzard of 1978, and from June 24 to September 10, 1983, for track work between Wonderland and Orient Heights. Modernization and platform lengthening work at Wonderland, which included ramps for accessibility, began in August 1988. Wonderland was the third Blue Line station to be made accessible (after Suffolk Downs in 1984 and State eastbound in 1987).

Wonderland was closed for approximately one year starting on June 25, 1994, as the station was rebuilt along with Suffolk Downs, Revere Beach and Beachmont stations as part of the Blue Line Modernization Program. Blue Line service temporarily ended at Orient Heights and buses served the closed stations during project. Wonderland station was largely rebuilt at a cost of $9 million; it reopened along with the other stations on June 24, 1995. The station was closed while additional platform repair work was performed from June 21 to July 3, 2008. Wonderland station was the eponymous destination of the main characters 1998 film Next Stop Wonderland.

=== Wonderland Intermodal Transit Center ===
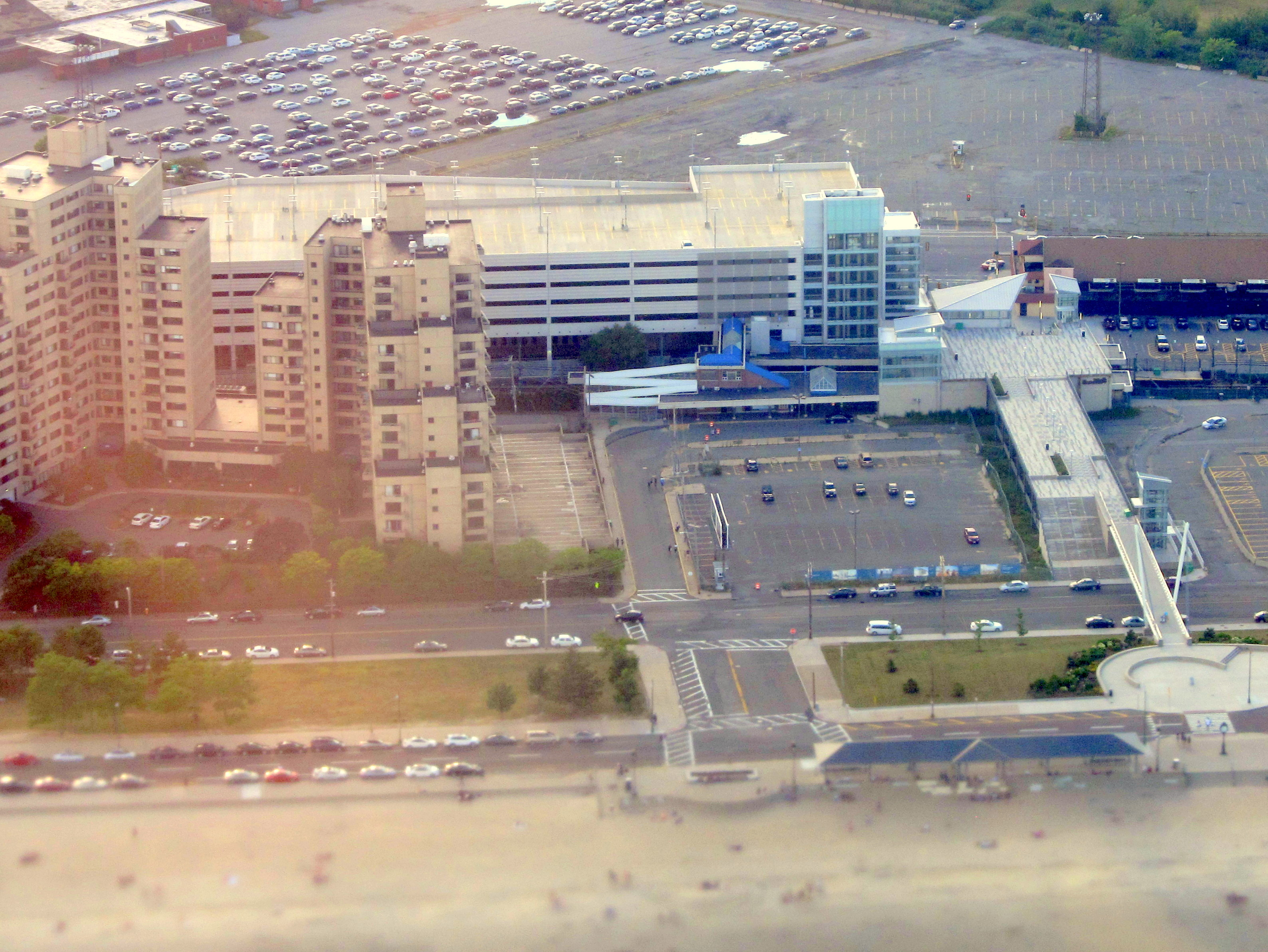
Wonderland Intermodal Transit Center in July 2016

As early as 1973, the MBTA proposed constructing a parking garage at Wonderland. The project was stalled by the 1973–1975 recession. In 2006, the MBTA settled a lawsuit with the Conservation Law Foundation over emissions from increased auto traffic through downtown Boston due to the Big Dig. As part of the settlement, the MBTA was required to implement 20 transit improvements.

One of these projects was the Wonderland Intermodal Transit Center, included the 1465-space South Parking Garage as well as a new sheltered busway, bicycle storage, and improved pedestrian connections. The environmental assessment for the project was completed in January 2010.

Construction began in September 2010; the new garage and busway opened on June 30, 2012. The $53.5 million project was partially funded by the 2009 Stimulus Act. The MBTA began work on an elevated plaza at the station and a footbridge over Ocean Avenue to Revere Beach in September 2011. The $20 million project, including the Christina and John Markey Memorial Pedestrian Bridge opened on July 4, 2013.

In March 2012, the MBTA announced plans to place solar panels on the roof of the new South Garage. The panels were to be installed and maintained by an outside contractor. A winning bidder was chosen in June 2012 and approved by the board in September, with expected completion by June 2013; however, the installation did not occur.

=== Bus service ===
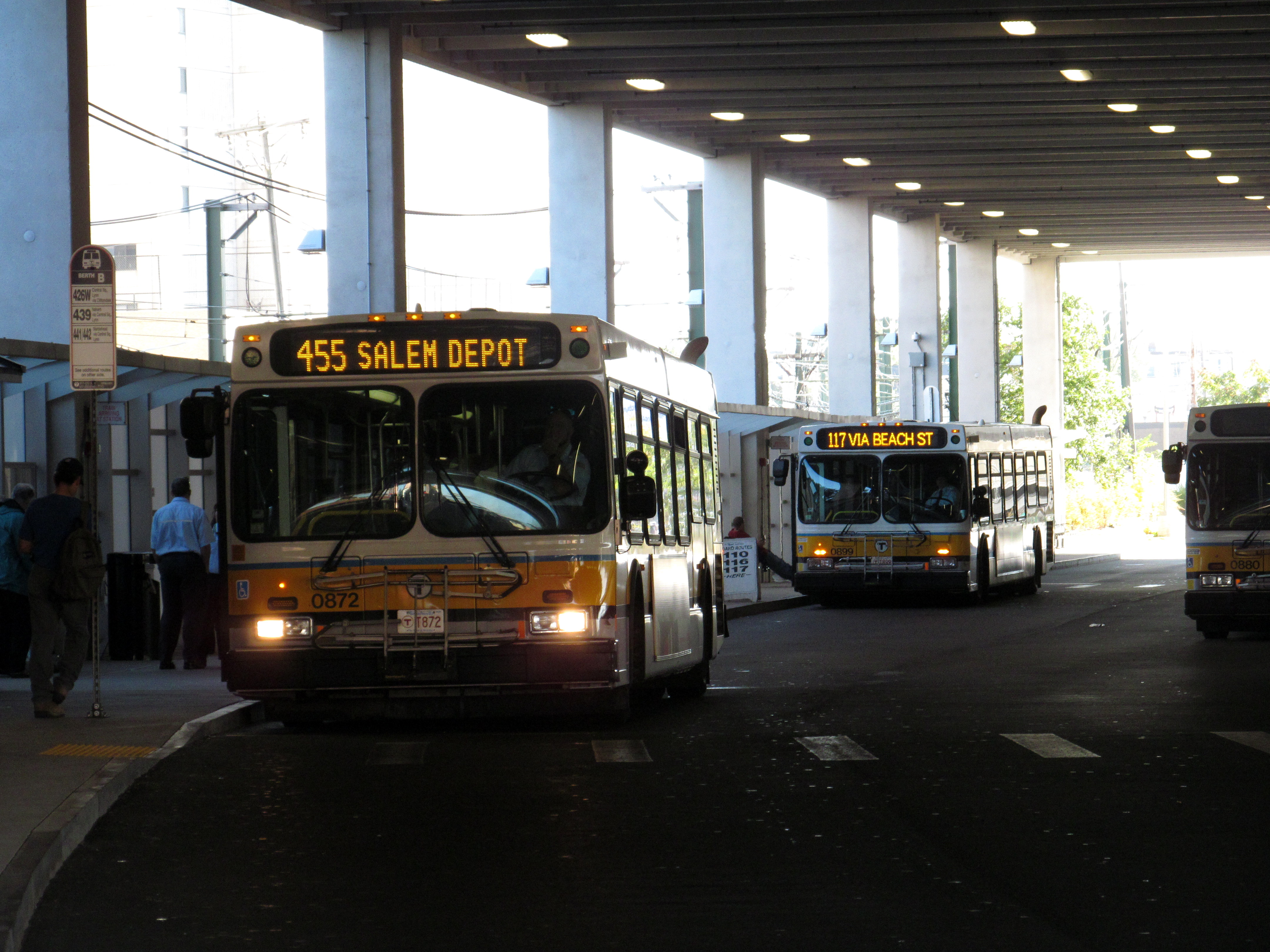
Buses on routes 117 and 455 boarding passengers in the Wonderland garage busway in September 2014

Wonderland opened with a busway on the eastern (Ocean Avenue) side of the station. It was initially served by trolleybus routes 110, 116, 117, and 118, which had previously used Revere Beach Loop. Route 118 was discontinued on June 18, 1955, while route 110 only served Wonderland during summer months from 1956 to 1962 before resuming year-round service. Summer-only Malden Square–Wonderland route 113 also ran most years until 1987. The trolleybus routes were converted to buses in 1961 and 1963. Several privately run routes to Saugus, Malden, Lynn, and Winthrop also served the station. The MBTA took over the routes from Service Bus Lines in 1975; only route 411 lasted past the end of the decade. It stopped at Wonderland starting in 1975.

The MBTA acquired the Eastern Massachusetts Street Railway bus system, which included a network serving Lynn and other North Shore points, in 1968. The MBTA continued to operate the company's Lynn–Haymarket route via North Shore Route (soon renumbered 440), which had stopped at Wonderland since shortly after the station opened. From December 1977 to February 1981 and June 1984 to March 1991, Wonderland was the inner terminus for Sunday service on the route, which was merged with routes 441 and 442 in 1991. In 1989, the MBTA planned to cut all North Shore–Boston routes to Wonderland, but dropped the plan due to public objection.

Route 448 and 449 were created in 1997 as variations of routes 441 and 442, resulting in four routes that stopped outside Wonderland on North Shore Road. Beginning in June 1999, some weekday morning route 426 trips were diverted to Wonderland as route 425 due to congestion on the Tobin Bridge. Wonderland became a terminal for more North Shore routes in June 2002. Route 425 was renumbered 426W, with all weekend service on the route also operating to Wonderland as 426W. Weekend service and some weekday morning service on routes 441, 442, 450, and 455 were redirected to Wonderland with the W suffix added; the weekday 450 trips to Wonderland were renumbered 424.

All buses serving Wonderland were diverted to the new busway in July 2012 except for inbound route 448 and 449 buses (which remained on North Shore Road) and westbound route 411 buses (on Ocean Avenue). All weekday service on routes 441, 442, and 455 was cut back from Haymarket to Wonderland; those routes dropped the W suffix. Some route 439 service was also extended to Wonderland. The Ocean Avenue busway was closed. Inbound route 448 and 449 buses began using the busway in September 2016, as did westbound route 411 buses in August 2021. Afternoon peak route 424 service was cut back to Wonderland in September 2019, leaving routes 426W and 450W as the only routes with W suffixes for Wonderland service.

=== Proposed Lynn extension ===
Ever since the 1954 Revere extension was cut short to Wonderland, a further extension to Lynn has been planned. Various state and federal reports in 1966, 1969, 1973, 1978, and 1983 all recommended extensions of the Blue Line to Lynn or even Salem, but funding was instead given to the Haymarket North Extension and Southwest Corridor projects on the Orange Line and the Alewife and Braintree extensions of the Red Line. The extension is still continually discussed, but due to the lack of an identified funding source it has not received priority. The Draft Environmental Impact Statement, which has been under development since 2002, will include several possible projects. They include extending the Blue Line directly to Lynn, a shorter extension to a new Revere Center commuter rail station, or a direct transfer from Wonderland via people mover to the new commuter rail station.
