= Orient Heights station =

Rapid transit in Boston, Massachusetts, US

Orient Heights
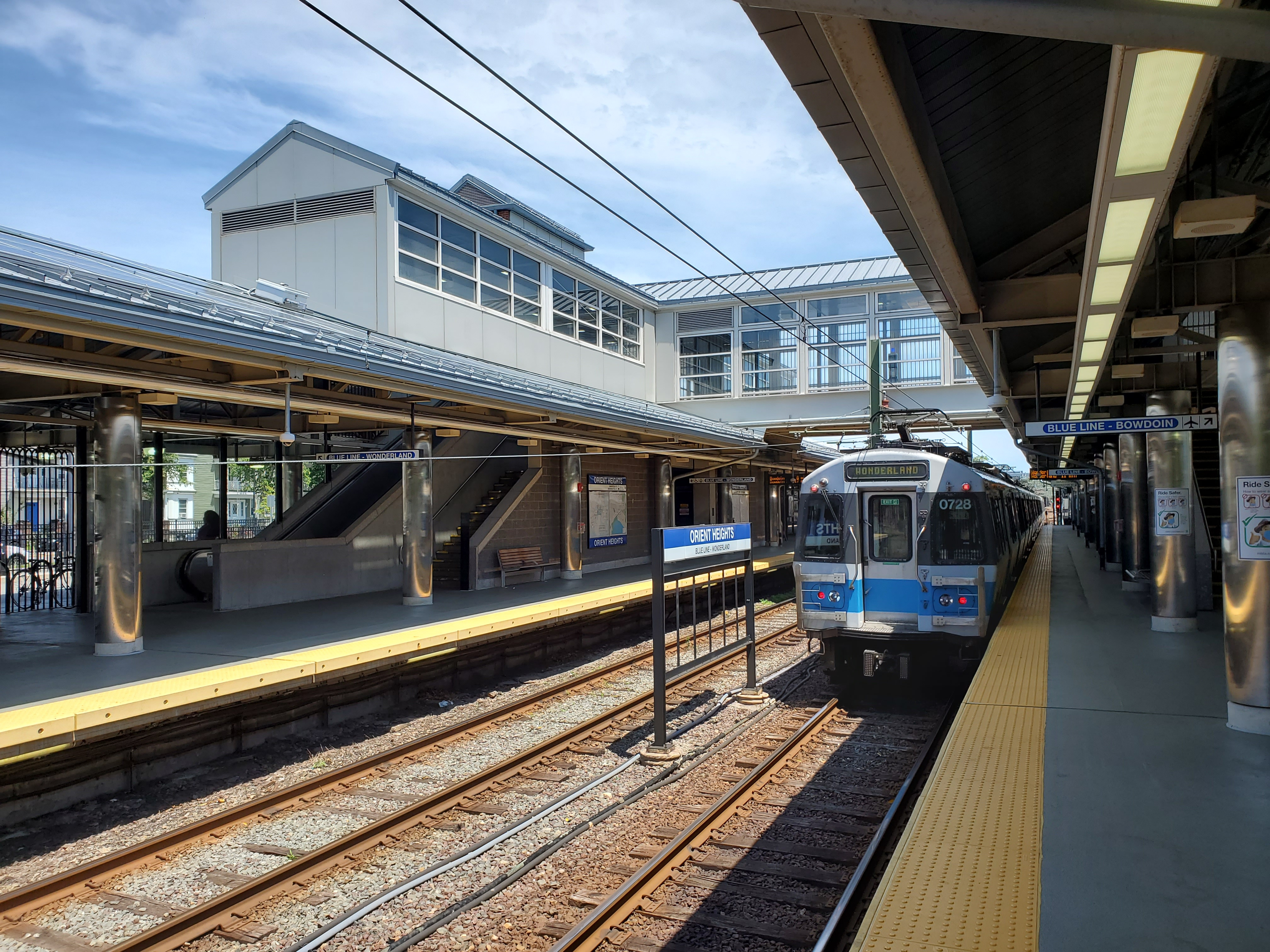
- An outbound train leaving Orient Heights station in July 2021

General information
- Location: 1000 Bennington Street; East Boston, Boston, Massachusetts
- Coordinates: 42.3869°N 71.0048°W
- Line: Revere Extension
- Platforms: 2 side platforms
- Tracks: 2
- Connections: MBTA bus: 120, 712, 713

Construction
- Parking: 434 spaces ($5.00 fee)
- Cycle facilities: 8 spaces
- Accessible: yes

History
- Opened: 1875 (BRB&L); January 5, 1952 (rapid transit)
- Closed: 1940 (BRB&L)
- Rebuilt: March 23–November 26, 2013

Passengers
- FY2019: 4,300 daily boardings

Services
Preceding station	MBTA	Following station
Wood Island toward Bowdoin	Blue Line	Suffolk Downs toward Wonderland
Location

Orient Heights station is a rapid transit station in Boston, Massachusetts. The station serves the MBTA Blue Line. It is located off Bennington Street in East Boston's Orient Heights neighborhood. Formerly a Boston, Revere Beach and Lynn Railroad station under various names from 1875 to 1940, it reopened in 1952. The 1952-built station was closed in March 2013 for a complete rebuilding to provide full accessibility and reopened on November 26, 2013.

Orient Heights station is the primary rapid transit connection for the Orient Heights neighborhood of East Boston, as well as for Winthrop. It also serves as a bus transfer station, with three routes terminating at the station. Orient Heights Yard, the main Blue Line yard, branches off the main line just north of the station. Because of the proximity, Blue Line employees report to work at Orient Heights station.

== History ==
=== BRB&L era ===
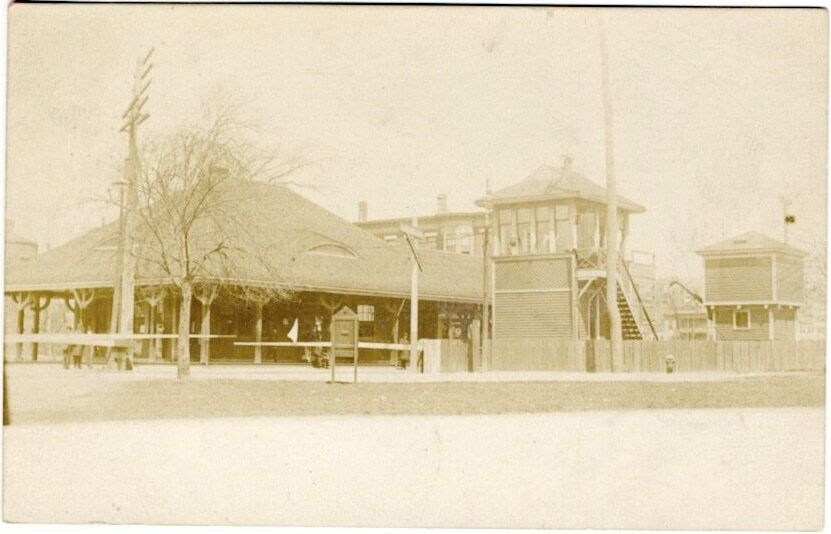
c. 1901-1907 postcard of Orient Heights station and the interlocking tower controlling access to the carhouse and the Winthrop Loop

The narrow gauge Boston, Revere Beach and Lynn Railroad (BRB&L) opened from East Boston to Lynn on July 29, 1875. The BRB&L opened with Winthrop station located near Saratoga Street.

The station was renamed as Winthrop Junction in 1877 when the Boston, Winthrop, and Point Shirley Railroad opened to Winthrop Center, and again as Orient Heights in April 1892. The station was the junction between the main line and the Winthrop Center branch during its short operation from 1877 to 1885, and between the main line and the Winthrop Loop after the latter's 1888 opening.

The state railroad commissioners began considering elimination of the Saratoga Street grade crossing adjacent to the station in 1909. Construction of a bridge carrying the street over the tracks began on October 6, 1912, and it opened on September 18, 1913. Nearby residents were opposed to the bridge because the 5% grade of its approaches, which required a team of horses to aid heavy vehicles.

By 1928 the line was electrified, with pre-pay stations - more a rapid transit line than a conventional railroad. However, due to the Great Depression, the BRB&L shut down on January 27, 1940.

=== MBTA era ===
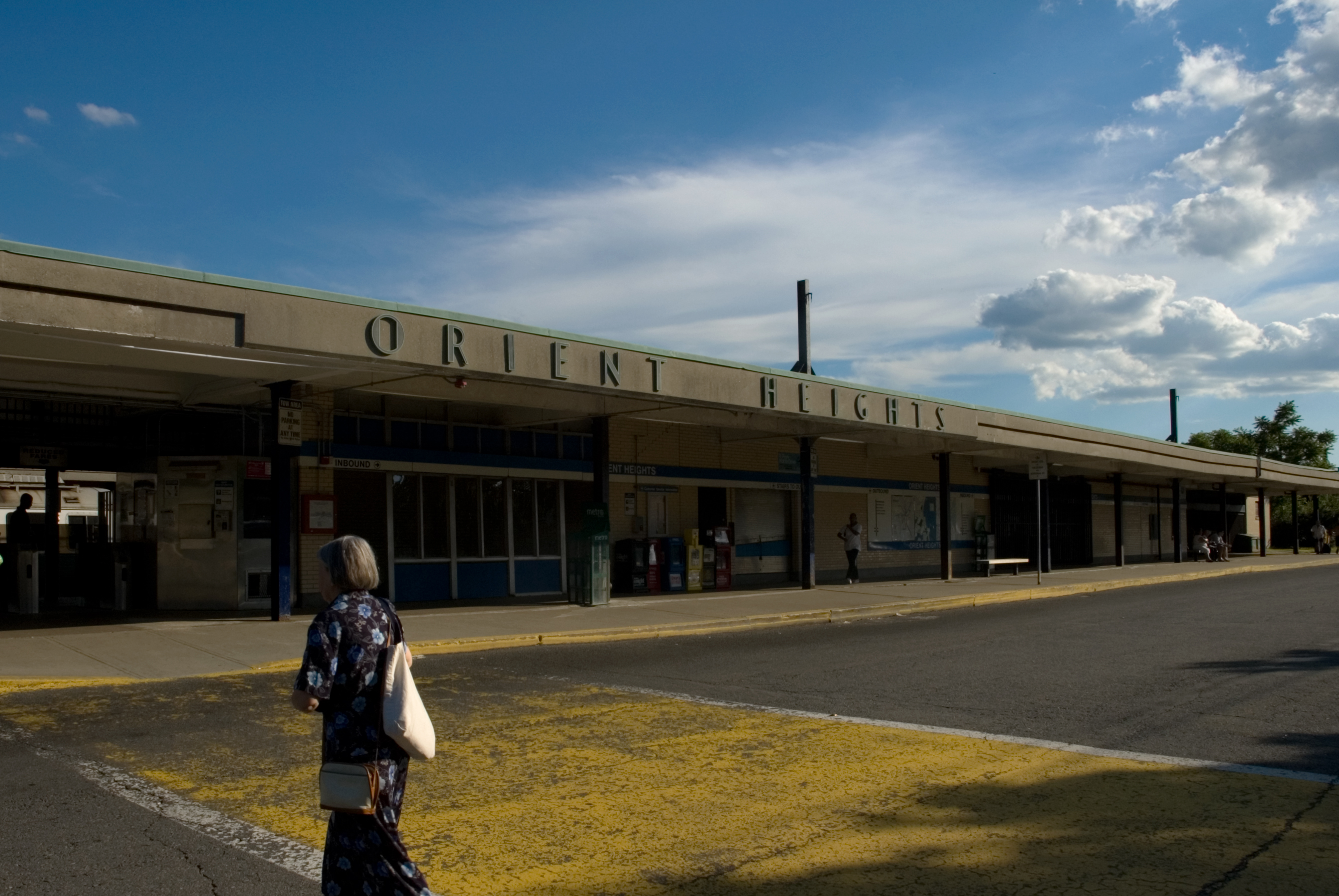
The 1952-built station in 2006

In 1941, the Boston Elevated Railway bought the BRB&L right of way from Day Square to Revere Beach for use as a high-speed trolley line similar to the Ashmont–Mattapan High-Speed Line; these plans were delayed by the onset of World War II. However, the 1926 Report on Improved Transportation Facilities and 1945–47 Coolidge Commission Report recommended that the East Boston Tunnel line, which had been converted to rapid transit from streetcars in 1924, be extended to Lynn via the BBRB&L route rather than using it for a trolley line.

In 1947, the newly formed Metropolitan Transit Authority (M.T.A.) decided to build to Lynn as a rapid transit line, and construction began in October 1948. The first part of the Revere Extension opened to Orient Heights on January 5, 1952, with intermediate stations at Airport and Day Square. The station was the terminus of the line until April 21, 1952, when Suffolk Downs station opened. Until September 1972, some trains terminated at Orient Heights rather than Wonderland to provide more frequent service on the inner part of the line. The MTA began charging for parking at its stations, including Orient Heights, on November 2, 1953.

During temporary construction and track work on the outer section of the line and during severe weather conditions, Orient Heights is sometimes used as the terminus, as its busways can accommodate the replacement bus service. From February 1 to December 16, 1981, Orient Heights–Wonderland buses operated on Sundays due to budget cuts. From June 25, 1994 to June 24, 1995, Orient Heights was the terminus at all times to permit reconstruction of the outer stations as part of the Blue Line Modernization Program.

=== Reconstruction ===
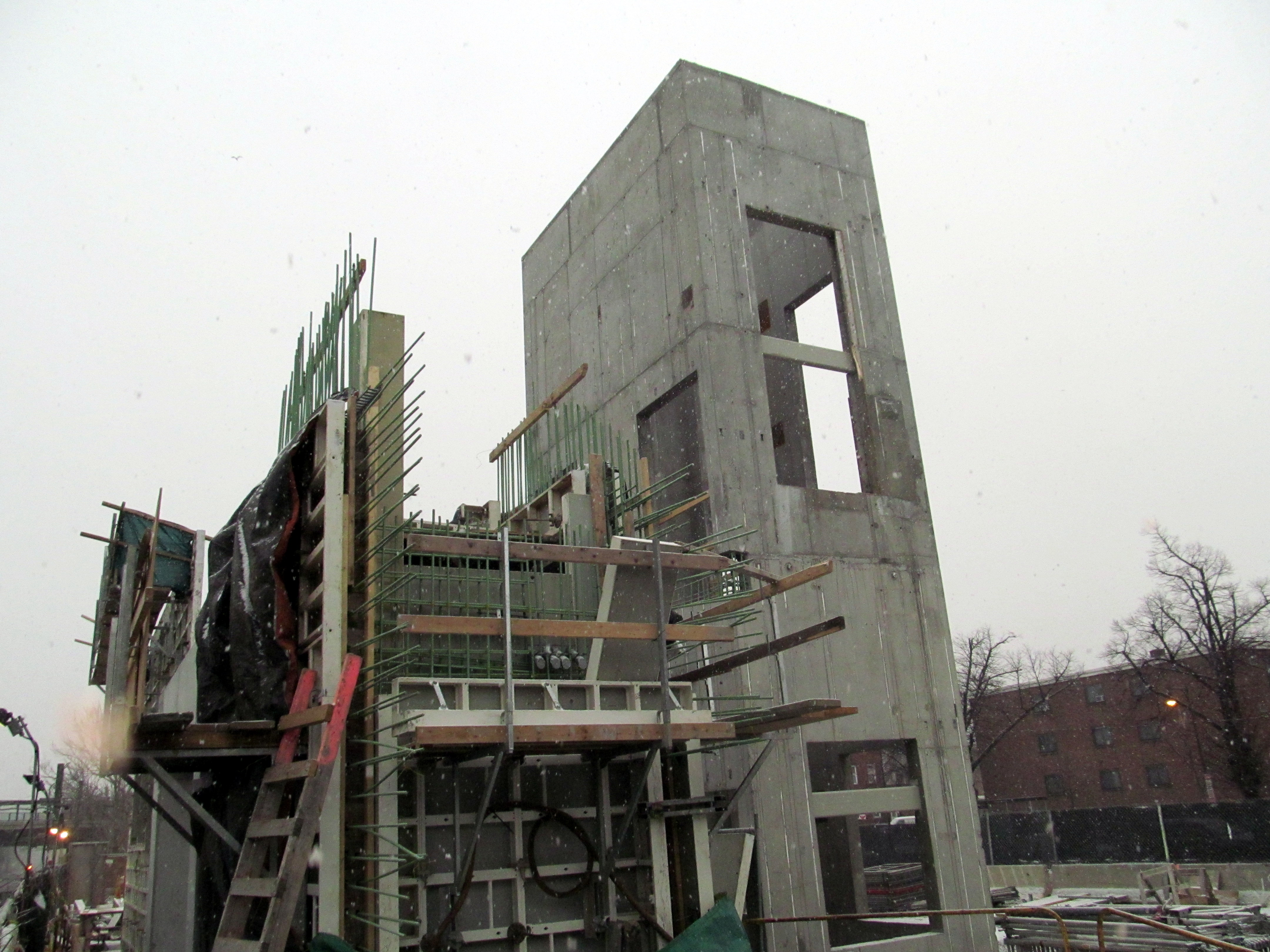
Inbound elevator shaft in January 2013

Orient Heights was the last Blue Line station in East Boston to be rebuilt for accessibility. (The only others on the line were Government Center and Bowdoin, both in downtown Boston). Due to this distinction, it was the last remaining station in the MBTA that still had a 1967 system map, which showed the Charlestown and Washington Street Elevateds on the Orange Line and the Green Line A branch.

On October 5, 2011, the MBTA announced a $51 million reconstruction of the crumbling station, expected to be paid for mostly by the Federal Transit Administration. Much of the station was demolished in May 2012, with passengers using temporary platforms. The station closed on March 23, 2013, so that the remainder of the old station could be demolished and the new station built. Bus shuttles operated from Suffolk Downs during the closure, which ended on November 23, 2013.
