= Economy of Pittsburgh =

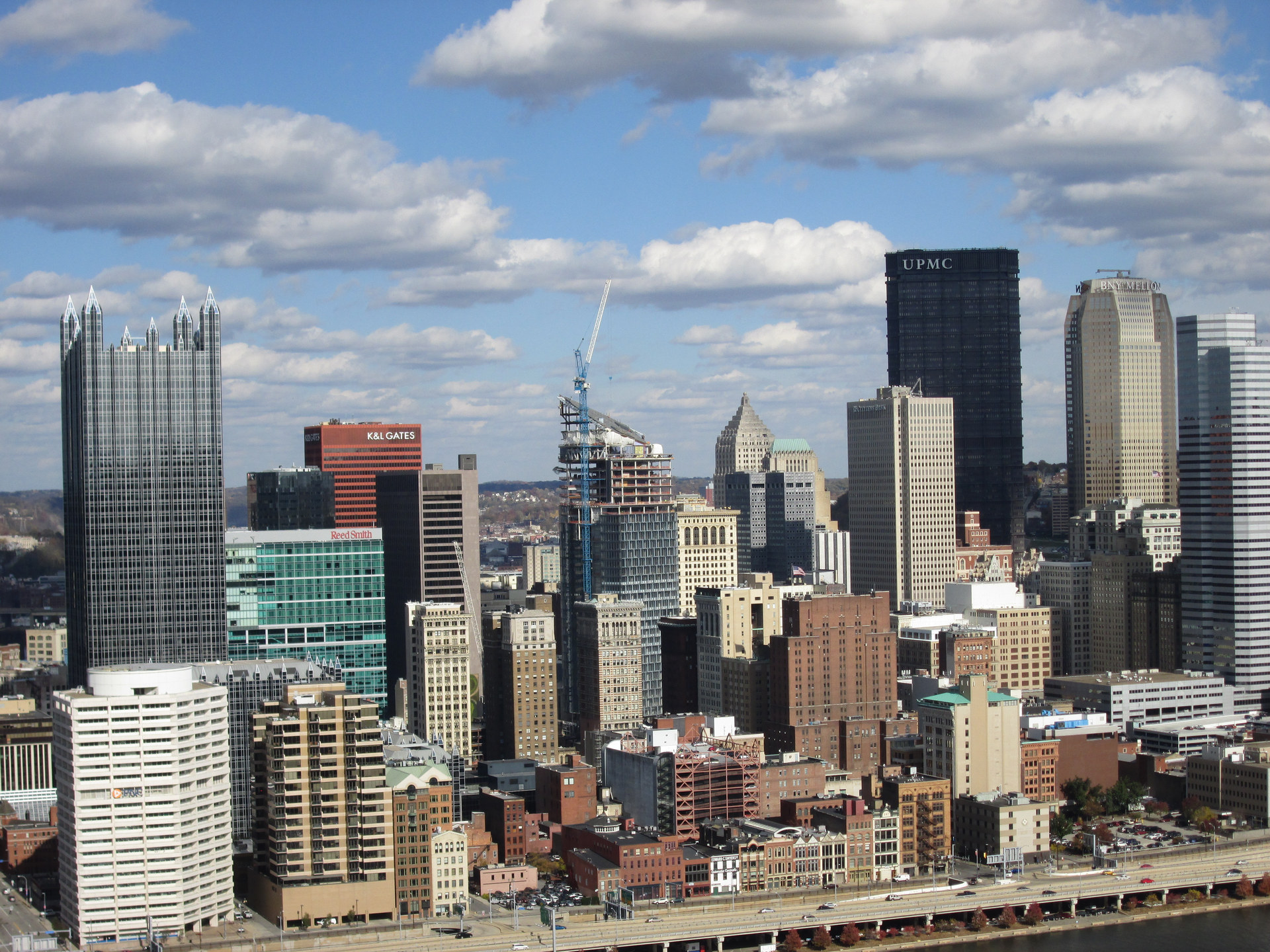
The Pittsburgh Central Business District, from Mt. Washington

The economy of Pittsburgh, PA, is diversified, focused on services, medicine, higher education, tourism, banking, corporate headquarters and high technology. Once the center of the American steel industry, and still known as "The Steel City", today the city of Pittsburgh has no steel mills within its limits, though Pittsburgh-based companies such as US Steel, Ampco Pittsburgh and Allegheny Technologies own several working mills in the Pittsburgh metropolitan area.

Pittsburgh was chosen for the 2009 G-20 summit as its transformation is an example of a 21st-century economy. On September 8, 2009, President Barack Obama stated, "Pittsburgh stands as a bold example of how to create new jobs and industries while transitioning to a 21st century economy."

On the list of best cities for job growth in 2009, created by Tara Weiss, a writer for Forbes magazine, Pittsburgh secured its spot because of its strength in the health care and education industries with healthy foundations in technology or robotics and banking industries. The 2009 list of all cities places Pittsburgh as the 169th-best city for job growth.

Pittsburgh has also ranked in the top five most livable cities in four of the seven multi-year rankings of Places Rated Almanac (1983, 1985, 1989, and 2007).

== History ==
=== Early foundation ===
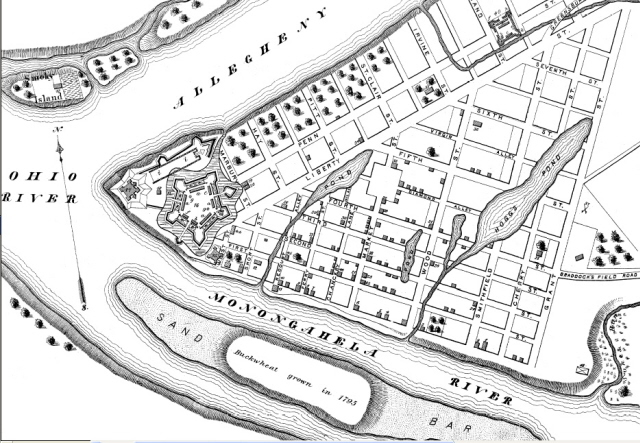
Early look at Pittsburgh

During the mid-18th century, the economy of the Pittsburgh region was focused on agriculture and trade. After the American Revolutionary War, the government placed a tax on whiskey in order to pay off national debt. In 1794, the Whiskey Rebellion occurred in Pittsburgh and was the first challenge to the government.“The fledgling Federal government had decided to levy its first tax against whiskey, but the farmers argued they didn't have cash to pay taxes on bartered goods, and marched in protest. Washington had to send troops to squelch the protest and enforce the tax laws.”

During the 18th century, large coal deposits were discovered throughout Pittsburgh. Mount Washington, originally called "Coal Hill", the “most valuable deposit of bituminous coal in the entire United States, was discovered there in 1760”. Along with the natural resources of the area, Pittsburgh was located at the intersection of the Monongahela, Ohio, and Allegheny Rivers, that is, along the major trade routes of the United States, thus making Pittsburgh "one of the world's leading industrial powerhouses".

“The first and largest industry emerging in the 1800s was boat building—both flatboats to transport waves of pioneers and goods downriver, and keelboats, which a strong crew could propel upstream as well.” The second biggest industry in the region was glass production. The first glass factory was built in 1795 by James O'Hara and Isaac Craig.

=== Nineteenth century ===
Pittsburgh’s wealthiest industrialists during the 19th century all lived in a single neighborhood known as East Liberty. The major list of industrialists includes H. J. Heinz, George Westinghouse, Andrew Carnegie, Thomas Mellon, Andrew Mellon, Henry Clay Frick and Philander Knox. All of these men shared similar ideas in the system of capitalism and utilized their skills to net the world’s highest income per capita during the 19th century in this single neighborhood. Andrew Carnegie was also known as a philanthropist to the region. “In 1889 he wrote "The Gospel of Wealth", in which he asserted that all personal wealth beyond that required to supply the needs of one's family should be regarded as a trust fund to be administered for the benefit of the community”. Subsequently, the Carnegie Library, which is free to the public, opened in Pittsburgh in 1890 and is still open presently. Overall, Carnegie donated over $350 million for the establishment of organizations that benefit the public. Wealthy industrialists founded the Duquesne Club in 1873 and the Greater Pittsburgh Chamber of Commerce in 1874. The Pittsburgh Stock Exchange was also formed in 1864 as the "Oil Exchange" before becoming the "Coal Exchange" in 1870 and then back to the "Oil Exchange" in 1878 until opening for all general stocks by 1894. The stock exchange closed its Fourth Avenue "financial district" doors in August 1974 after computerization had consolidated trades in New York, Chicago and other global centers but not before a 1966 response from the New York Stock Exchange board of possibly relocating their trading floor to the city's facilities.

Railroad networks reached the Pittsburgh area in the mid-19th century. The Ohio and Pennsylvania Railroad opened in 1851, which allowed passengers to travel through Allegheny and New Brighton while the Pennsylvania Railroad established "Pittsburgh service" as close as Turtle Creek from their Philadelphia hub that same year. A year later, in 1852, the Pennsylvania Railroad was completed to Downtown Pittsburgh. In 1856, the Allegheny Valley Railroad was built. Andrew Carnegie was one of the first to capitalize on the railways; in 1865 he founded the Pittsburgh Locomotive and Car Works which would be an industry leader from the city until 1919.

In 1892, the economy of Pittsburgh faced the Homestead Strike between the Amalgamated Association of Iron and Steel Workers and the Carnegie Steel Company. After the workers' previous wage contract expired in 1892, and a new negotiation was not reached, a violent conflict ensued leaving several dead and wounded. Ultimately, The Carnegie Steel company won and had avoided union formation in Pittsburgh.

=== Emergence of "Big Steel" ===
After Carnegie Steel was reorganized as U.S. Steel in 1901, it and J&L Steel dominated the local economy. Several secondary players contributed to the capacity of the metro area such as Cyclops Steel in Bridgeville, Pennsylvania from 1908 until 1987, Mesta Machinery in West Homestead, Pennsylvania from 1898 until 1983, Dravo Corporation at Neville Island, Pennsylvania until 1984, National Steel Corporation until 1992, Wean United as an independent until 1993 (still maintaining US headquarters in the city), Harbison Walker Refractories as an independent until 1967 (while still maintaining US headquarters in the city) and the still operational Allegheny Technologies and Ampco Pittsburgh. Bethlehem Steel, Republic Steel and LTV Steel also had large local operations. Other major mills of the area included:

- McKeesport Tube Works 1872–1987
- Edgar Thomson Steel Works 1873–present
- Hays Army Ammunition Plant 1942 – June 1971
- Clairton Steel Works April 21, 1903–1984
- Duquesne Steel Works 1886 – October 1, 1984, employed as many as 9,000 persons in the 1940s.
- Homestead Steel Works 1881 – May 24, 1986
- Carrie Furnace 1884–1982
- Saxonburg Mill -1987
- Verona Mill April 4, 1905- (two 20-gross-ton Symthe acid open hearth furnaces) (14,400 tons annually)
- Mon Valley Works – Irvin Plant 1938–present
- Midland Cyclops Steel Plant until October 15, 1982
- McKees Rocks, Pennsylvania Wheel and Axel plant (Lockhart Iron and Steel and Pressed Steel Car Corp.) Pressed Steel had as many as 12,000 employees.
- Donora US Steel Wire mill -1966 4,500 employees
- Monessen American Chain & Cable -1972 1,000 employees.
- East Monongahela Liggett Spring & Axle -1978 350 employees.
- McKeesport Ft. Pitt Steel Casting -1978 325 employees.
- Hazelwood J&L Steel -1981 1,000 employees.
- Glassport Bucyrus-Erie -1981 430 employees.
- West Homestead Mesta Machinery -1981 300 employees.
- West Mifflin Continental Can -1982 265 employees.
- Alcoa's New Kensington works 1893-March 1971 at its peak employed 3,300 workers on 75 acres under 1 million square feet of manufacturing space.
- Alcoa's Logan Ferry Powder Works 1918–?
- Alcoa's Coal Mine (north of New Kensington) 1918–1923

Carnegie's Union Railroad was founded in 1894 and is still in operation serving area steel mills.

=== Twentieth century ===
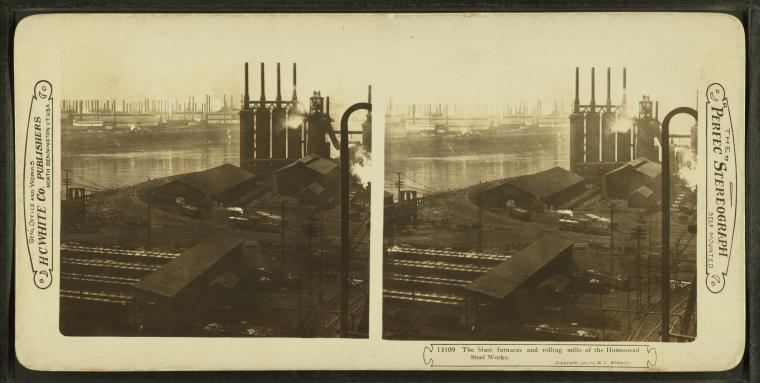
Pittsburgh Steel mill in Homestead circa 1907

In the early 20th century the economy of Pittsburgh was primarily driven by the steel industry and the city had reached a population 321,616. Throughout this period, Pittsburgh would see a spike in population and a slow decline at the end of the century. At one point Pittsburgh was the eighth-largest city in America. In 1901, The Amalgamated Association of Iron, Steel and Tin Workers organized a general strike against the U.S. Steel Corporation subsidiaries, the first strike since 1892.

A 1903 Pittsburgh Press front page highlighted the city's being a focus point for three different railroads. In 1911 the city was being referred to as the "Stogie capital of the nation" with several high quality cigar manufacturers located in the region.

Pittsburgh produced around one third of the national output of steel by the 1920s. During this period Pittsburgh was home to the world's largest tube and pipe mill, structural steel plant, rail mill, wire manufacturing plant, bridge and construction fabricating plant. "Boat building and metal industries were later the economic base of the region. When coke from coal began to replace charcoal from wood in iron and steel making Pittsburgh grew up as the heart of the industry. A plentiful supply of bituminous coal underlies the Pittsburgh area." Around forty percent of the nation's coal was obtained from within 100 miles of Pittsburgh.

Due to the reforms of Franklin Roosevelt's New Deal, steel unions gained success in Pittsburgh. The Wagner Act of 1935 gave employees rights to self-organize in labor unions and made it unlawful for employers to prevent or interfere with such unions.

By the 1950s industrial leaders worked with regional government leaders to foster and retain more local industry; organizations such as the RIDC were formed to further this goal.

However, in the early to mid-1980s the steel industry collapsed, leaving half of the nation's steelworkers unemployed. "The number of steel workers in the Pittsburgh area dropped from 90,000 in 1980 to 44,000 in just four years".

Motor Coils manufacturing company of suburban Forest Hills and Braddock has been a leading supplier to American railroads since 1957.

Pittsburgh was a major center for advertising and public relations firms in the 20th century such as Ketchum and Burson-Marsteller.

Retail chains such as G. C. Murphy, Thrift Drug, Thorofare, Fisher's Big Wheel and Giant Eagle were founded in the early part of the 20th century with Phar-Mor dominating local retail from the 1980s to the 2000s. Thorofare ceased operations in 1982 and Thrift Drug was bought out by Eckerd in 1996. Local stores of Loblaws closed in 1958, Kroger in 1966 (although it retains stores in nearby West Virginia counties) and A&P in 1972. IGA closed its area stores in the early 2000s.

=== Transition into the present economy ===
Within the transitional years between 1970 and 1990, Pittsburgh's Standard Metropolitan Statistical Area saw shifts in its main employers, which were the manufacturing sector. In 1970, one out of every three jobs was in the manufacturing sector. By 1980 this had slipped to one in four. In 1980, the average production worker in manufacturing was making $360.89 weekly, which was almost $70 more than the state and national average. During this period the largest group of occupational employment was blue collar. This group in 1980 accounted for almost 68 percent of the jobs market. In the 1980s, a decline in the manufacturing industry was expected. The accepted trend was that Pittsburgh would embrace “industrial robots”. Since 1955 Pittsburgh has seen a steady decline in manufacturing employment. In 1955 Pittsburgh had a population of 41.8 percent in the manufactory business. In 1980 that number had slipped to almost 25.3 percent.

Allegheny County is the center for health care and higher education employment. Higher education and health care were the biggest creators of high-wage jobs in the Pittsburgh region between 1999 and 2005. Education accounts for almost 80% of high-wage jobs in Allegheny County. The Pittsburgh area has seen growth in other sectors as well. Professional services, finance and wholesale trade were among the growing sectors. However, much of this growth was outside the borders of Allegheny County. This was detrimental to the county of Allegheny; however, the growth in the outer nine counties helped to stabilize the loss of employment. With big events happening in Pittsburgh throughout the late 2000s, the tourism industry has flourished. The industry has created over 11,000 new jobs in the area, some 6,000 of them within Allegheny County.

Pittsburgh has long been a major finance and banking center.

== Present situation ==
Since 2009 Pittsburgh has hosted the annual DUG East Conference.

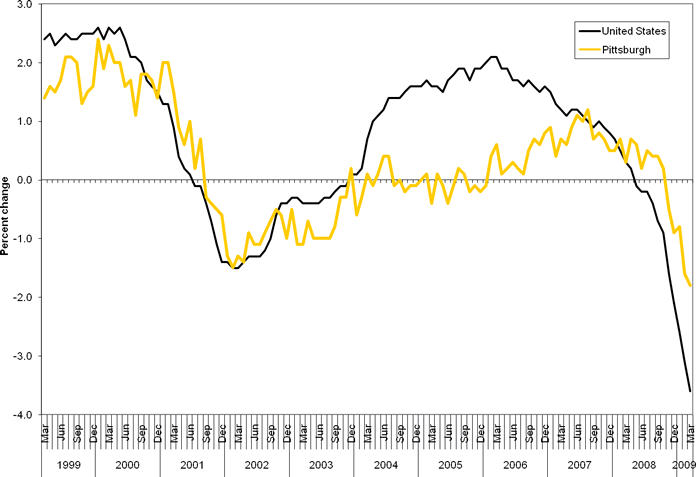
"Total nonfarm employment, over-the-year percent change in the United States and the Pittsburgh metropolitan area, March 1999-2009"

The following is a list of the top ten private employers in Pittsburgh.

Rank	Employer	Number of Pittsburgh employees	Product(s)
1	University of Pittsburgh Medical Center	40,600	Health care
2	University of Pittsburgh	12,600	Higher education
3	PNC Financial Services	9,200	Financial services
4	Allegheny Health Network	8,900	Health care
5	Giant Eagle	8,000	Supermarkets
6	Bank of New York Mellon	7,610	Financial services
7	Highmark	5,270	Health insurance
8	U.S. Steel	4,700	Steel manufacturing
9	Carnegie Mellon University	4,600	Higher education
10	Verizon Communications	3,750	Telecommunications

Pittsburgh saw fewer effects of the 2008 financial crisis and the Great Recession than most American cities. The city's transition from heavy dependence on the manufacturing industries to an economy based on health services, education, and innovative technologies kept Pittsburgh from the worst of the recession. The housing industry never saw the over-inflation rates other regions were dealing with as housing prices rose two percent in the last quarter of 2008, while other cities in the nation saw a much higher decline percentage. In the period between 2006 and 2011, the Pittsburgh MSA experienced over 10% appreciation in housing prices—the highest appreciation out of the largest 25 MSAs in the United States. 22 of the top 25 MSAs saw a depreciation of housing values during the same period.

=== National non-profits ===
Several national or global non-profits call Pittsburgh home including:

- Learning Disabilities Association of America (since 1963)
- Institute for Research, Education and Training in Addictions
- National Center for Juvenile Justice (since 1973)
- Colcom Foundation (since 1996)
- Laurel Foundation (since 1951)
- Heinz Endowments
- Printing Industries of America (since 2003)

== Twenty-first-century progression ==
The shifting economy of Pittsburgh has seen changes since the 1990s; these are primarily in banking, health care and technology. However, In December 2004, Pittsburgh was forced into an Act 47 because the finances in the city were down. In January 2003 Pittsburgh's unemployment rate reached 6.8%, but has seen a major decline in, as in April 2005 the rates were near only 4.8%. Since one in every five jobs in Pittsburgh lies within the health care service, Pittsburgh was able to hold steady during the recent economic downturn. During this, the city also began to see growth in other occupations such as the business service and construction. The business service sectors in 2008 saw an increase of over 3,000 jobs. During the downturn, Pittsburgh still developed many parts of the city creating over 1,000 construction jobs in the region.

=== Technology industry ===
Pittsburgh has established itself as a technology hub with such companies as Google, Apple Inc., Uber, Facebook and RAND establishing campuses in the city. The Pittsburgh Technology Center, Pittsburgh Supercomputing Center and Pittsburgh LAN Coalition also develop major innovations.

Companies such as Duolingo, Petrosoft, Modcloth, Guru.com, Songwhale and others have global headquarters in the city. The Crons company designs motivational athletic apparel.

=== 2009 G-20 Pittsburgh Summit ===
Pittsburgh was chosen to hold the 2009 G-20 summit for multiple reasons. Pittsburgh utilizes its past by building on previous successes in manufacturing, business services, and green energy. "Pittsburgh manufacturers employ almost 100,000 workers and the region is the second-largest market in the United States for metals industry employment." Pittsburgh is also home to some of the world's largest business and financial services, which supply the greatest amount to the regional economic output. In the past, innovation in energy has been advanced through commercialization of oil, coal, and natural gas. More focus and attention is being given to the innovation in sustainability and efficiency while protecting the environment as Pittsburgh has more than 30 LEED certified buildings.

=== Economic development plan ===
The Commonwealth of Pennsylvania requires every county to develop a land use and growth management plan. Allegheny Places is the plan for Pittsburgh and Allegheny County. It was adopted in November 2008 and is a “unique blueprint for a sustainable future envisioned by the citizens of the County”. The plan has a steering committee with over 100 members, an advisory committee with over 400 members, and a sounding board. The plan advocates a future in which:

- Equitable access to the opportunities and benefits of economic development to all residents is provided
- Former brownfields are transformed and developed
- Transit-oriented development efforts reduce road congestion and connect the major economic areas – Oakland, Downtown, and the Pittsburgh International Airport
- The promotion of greenways will link the community with parks, trails, riverfronts, etc.
- Affordable and high-quality housing exists for all
- A diversified economy provides stable, well-paying jobs

The economic development plan includes enterprise zones, research and technology developments, development of research parks, such as the University of Pittsburgh Applied Research Center, partnerships with economic development organizations, and venture capital initiatives.

An Urban Enterprise Zone is a location within the inner city free from import duties, taxes, and some government regulations. Studies of enterprise zones have shown increased job growth and investment. In the majority of studies, there is an apparent relationship between the creation of enterprise zones and increased economic activity in the zones. The zones also show economic activity not typical of the surrounding metropolitan area. However, success is often questionable and subject to local conditions. Allegheny County has 26 enterprise zones, in which 17 are in the City of Pittsburgh.

The research and technology sector is growing due to the local universities, medical centers, the technology cluster, and the provision of financial capital to fund its development. These attributes provide the specific infrastructure required of sought-after industries. Therefore, this could attract business to the region and sustain or expand existing firms, which should result in a net increase in total jobs. However, this type of development is still fairly new, which means it is difficult to draw any noteworthy conclusions about its potential. Also, the presence of universities provides the context for university-industry technology transfers, which is the effective movement of technology to industry via students trained in detailed programs to meet the detailed wants of the industry.

== Economic upward mobility ==
According to a 2014 report published by the National Bureau of Economic Research, Pittsburgh is the second-best American city for intergenerational economic mobility; in other words, Pittsburgh is the second best city to achieve the American Dream.

== 2013 news ==
As of early 2013 the largest property managers in the Pittsburgh area included CBRE Group, Oxford Development, RIDC and JLL.

On August 13, 2013, the Pittsburgh Post-Gazette reported that Heinz would lay off 350 office employees who work in the Pittsburgh area. After the layoff, the company will still have approximately 800 employees in the Pittsburgh area.

== 2014 news ==
Work is underway for an innovation roadmap for the city.
