= List of United States Air Force plants =

During the existence of the United States Air Force, there have been many plants that have been owned by the service and were operated by private contractors. These facilities were designed so that they would build aircraft parts for the government. Over time, many of the facilities have gone on to be purchased by private operators, although a few still remain in operation as government facilities.

== Plants ==
- Air Force Plant 1
- Air Force Plant 2
- Air Force Plant 3
- Air Force Plant 4
- Air Force Plant 5
- Air Force Plant 6
- Air Force Plant 7
- Air Force Plant 8
- Air Force Plant 9
- Air Force Plant 10
- Air Force Plant 11
- Air Force Plant 12
- Air Force Plant 13
- Air Force Plant 14
- Air Force Plant 15
- Air Force Plant 16
- Air Force Plant 17
- Air Force Plant 18
- Air Force Plant 19
- Air Force Plant 20
- Air Force Plant 21
- Air Force Plant 22
- Air Force Plant 23
- Air Force Plant 24
- Air Force Plant 25
- Air Force Plant 26
- Air Force Plant 27
- Air Force Plant 28
- Air Force Plant 29
- Air Force Plant 30
- Air Force Plant 31
- Air Force Plant 32
- Air Force Plant 33
- Air Force Plant 34
- Air Force Plant 35
- Air Force Plant 36
- Air Force Plant 37
- Air Force Plant 38
- Air Force Plant 39
- Air Force Plant 40
- Air Force Plant 41
- Air Force Plant 42
- Air Force Plant 43
- Air Force Plant 44
- Air Force Plant 45
- Air Force Plant 46
- Air Force Plant 47
- Air Force Plant 48
- Air Force Plant 49
- Air Force Plant 50
- Air Force Plant 51
- Air Force Plant 52
- Air Force Plant 53
- Air Force Plant 54
- Air Force Plant 55
- Air Force Plant 56
- Air Force Plant 57
- Air Force Plant 58
- Air Force Plant 59
- Air Force Plant 60
- Air Force Plant 61
- Air Force Plant 62
- Air Force Plant 63
- Air Force Plant 64
- Air Force Plant 65
- Air Force Plant 66
- Air Force Plant 67
- Air Force Plant 68
- Air Force Plant 69
- Air Force Plant 70
- Air Force Plant 71
- Air Force Plant 72
- Air Force Plant 73
- Air Force Plant 74
- Air Force Plant 75
- Air Force Plant 76
- Air Force Plant 77
- Air Force Plant 78
- Air Force Plant 79
- Air Force Plant 80
- Air Force Plant 81
- Air Force Plant 82
- Air Force Plant 83
- Air Force Plant 84
- Air Force Plant 85

== See also ==
- List of United States Army Air Force modification centers
