= George Fuller =

George Fuller may refer to:

- George Fuller (Australian politician) (1861–1940), twice premier of New South Wales, Australia
- George Fuller (painter) (1822–1884), American figure and portrait painter
- George Fuller (American politician) (1802–1888), U.S. Representative from Pennsylvania
- George A. Fuller (1851–1900), architect and general contractor, "inventor" of modern skyscrapers
- George C. Fuller, American theologian and seminary president
- George Fuller (British politician) (1833–1927), British Liberal politician
- George F. Fuller (1869–1962), industrialist in Worcester, Massachusetts, United States
- George Lawrence Fuller, Australian farmer, quarry owner and shopkeeper
- George M. Fuller, American theoretical physicist
- George W. Fuller (1868–1934), sanitary engineer
- George Fuller (architect), Chicago architect, colleague of Floyd Naramore
