= Wyman-Gordon Grafton Plant =

Manufacturing plant in the United States

- Built: 1946
- Location: North Grafton, Massachusetts
- Coordinates: 42°13′57.58″N 71°43′37.88″W

Wyman-Gordon Grafton Plant, formerly known as Air Force Plant 63, is a plant of Wyman-Gordon located in North Grafton, Massachusetts. It was purchased by Wyman-Gordon in 1982 from the United States Air Force, although the company had been operating as a contractor for the plant since its establishment. The plant is also home to the one of two of the nation's largest forging presses.

== Presses ==
The Wyman-Gordon Grafton Plant is home to some of the world's largest hydraulic presses.

=== 2000 Ton Press ===
Wyman Gordon's 2000 ton open die forging press was built by Sack.

=== Heavy Press Program Presses ===
==== 18000 Ton Press ====
The 18000 ton press began operation in 1946 as a part of the Heavy Press Program. It was built by Mesta Machinery, and it was the first heavy closed die press in America, and started pressing experimental parts out of aluminum and magnesium.

==== 35000 Ton Press ====
The 35000 ton press began operation in 1955. It was built by Loewy Hydropress, and continues to operate.

==== 50000 Ton Press ====
The Wyman-Gordon 50,000 ton forging press also began operation in 1955 and, like the 35000 ton press, was built by Loewy Hydropress. It is also still in service.
