= Wyman-Gordon 50,000 ton forging press =

Forging press in Massachusetts, US

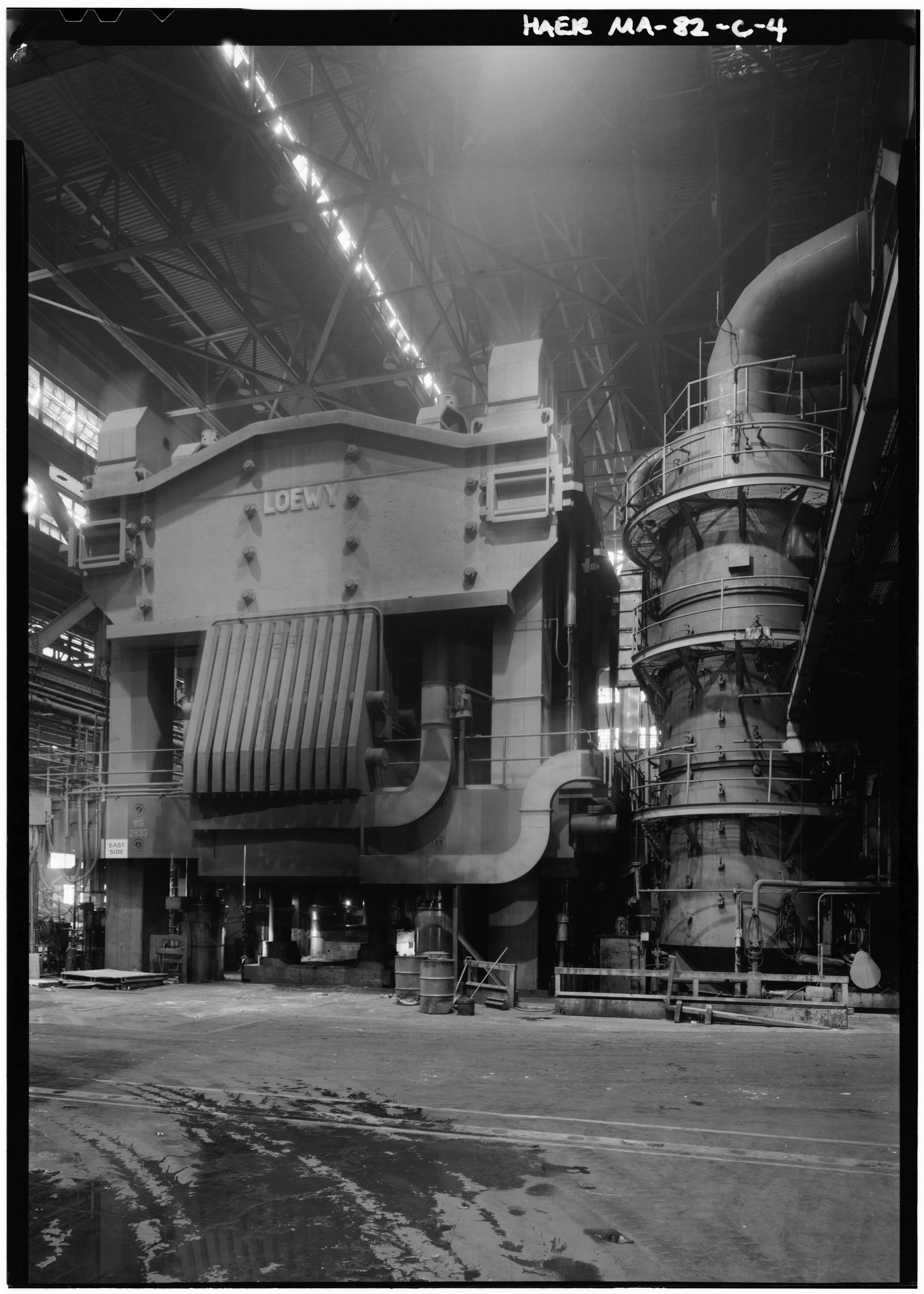
The press, circa 1985

The Wyman-Gordon 50,000-ton forging press is a forging press located at the Wyman-Gordon Grafton Plant that was built as part of the Heavy Press Program by the United States Air Force. It was manufactured by Loewy Hydropress of Pittsburgh, Pennsylvania and began operation in October, 1955.
