= Robert Waring Stoddard =

- Robert W. Stoddard (left), City Manager McGrath and U.S. Senator John F. Kennedy before take-off in a helicopter at Worcester Regional Airport for inspection of areas devastated by the 1953 Worcester tornado.
- Born: January 22, 1906; Trenton, New Jersey, United States
- Died: December 14, 1984 (aged 78); Worcester, Massachusetts, United States
- Occupation: Executive
- Known for: President of Wyman-Gordon

Robert Waring Stoddard (January 22, 1906 – December 14, 1984) was President of Wyman-Gordon, a major industrial enterprise, and one of the founders of the anticommunist John Birch Society.

== Early years ==
The Stoddard family was one of the oldest and richest in Worcester, Massachusetts. Stoddard attended the Bancroft School in Worcester, then Worcester Academy, graduating in 1924. He went on to Yale University, and later said his opposition to Communism formed at that time. He had attended a Communist rally and what he heard made him opposed to communism for life. He married Helen Estabrook Stoddard in 1933.

== Wyman-Gordon ==
The Stoddards owned Wyman-Gordon, a major company that manufactured forgings for the automotive, aerospace and gas turbine industries. Robert Stoddard joined Wyman-Gordon in 1929. He succeeded his father Harry G. Stoddard as president in 1955. Stoddard was opposed to the Civil Rights Act of 1964, which would make racial discrimination illegal. In 1964, the company employed black workers only as janitors. Abbie Hoffman was the press officer for a group of civil-rights agitators who targeted the Worcester plant for picketing. Later, they filed petitions with the Massachusetts Commission Against Discrimination and the U.S. Air Force. In July that year, the company agreed to change its hiring practices.

Stoddard was elected chairman of Wyman-Gordon in 1967. He retired from the company in 1972.

== Worcester Telegram & Gazette ==
The Worcester Telegram and Evening Gazette were separate newspapers founded in the 19th century. T.T. Ellis bought both papers in 1920, and sold them in 1925 to Harry Stoddard, Robert's father, and George Booth, a former Telegram editor. Later, Robert Stoddard took over ownership of the two newspapers, as well as the main radio station in the city. The morning Telegram and the Evening Gazette helped Stoddard exert great influence in the city of Worcester. The conservative journals opposed labor unions, social programs, and the Democratic party.

Stoddard was chairman of the Worcester Telegram & Gazette for more than 20 years. He said that he did not want his papers to be organs of the John Birch Society, and had been criticized by fellow members of the society for not making enough use of the papers. When asked if he had ever disagreed with an editorial in one of the papers, he answered "All of them!" At times, however, Stoddard's increasingly extreme right-wing views caused friction with the editorial staff when they insisted on publishing articles of which he disapproved.

== Other activities ==
Stoddard was one of the members of a study group organized by the National Association of Manufacturers. The group published a report in 1957 describing "the extent to which labor unions in the United States hold and exercise monopolistic powers; also the circumstances under which such anti-social powers, which in other hands would be clearly illegal, are permitted to exist." In 1958, he was among the founders of the John Birch Society.

In 1982, Stoddard was a member of the Board of Governors of the Council for National Policy. He was chairman of the board of Raytheon and International Paper, a member of the board of First National Bank of Boston, member of the board of State Mutual Life Insurance Company, director and vice-president of the National Association of Manufacturers, director and president of the YMCA, and a member of the National Council of The John Birch Society.

== Death and legacy ==
Robert Stoddard died in December 1984 aged 78. The Stoddards sold the Worcester Telegram & Gazette to the San Francisco Chronicle, reportedly for $200 million. In April 1986, Wyman-Gordon bought back one million common shares from Stoddard's estate. His wife Helen (Estabrook) Stoddard died on 29 November 1999, aged 94. She was survived by her two daughters, seven grandchildren, and nine great-grandchildren.

Robert and Helen Stoddard were generous in supporting education and the arts. The Robert W. Stoddard '23 award for Outstanding Community Service is presented by the Bancroft school annually. They supported the Worcester Art Museum for many years. In December 1999, the museum opened The Stoddard Legacy, an exhibition that featured exquisite French Impressionist paintings from the Stoddard home and other major works the museum had acquired through the Stoddard Acquisition Fund.

The Stoddards and Wyman-Gordon had a long association with the Worcester Polytechnic Institute (WPI). Wyman-Gordon had been founded by two WPI graduates. The Stoddard Residence Center and the Stoddard Professorship in Management are named for Harry G. Stoddard. The Stoddard Residence Center was built between April 1969 and September 1970. Robert Stoddard, who was a member of the WPI Board of Trustees, provided funding, as did his brother-in-law, Paris Fletcher. The WPI materials program is housed in Stoddard Laboratories, named for Robert Stoddard.

According to a journalist on the Telegram & Gazette who knew Stoddard: "He was civic-minded, generous and a pillar of the community. He was not a dour misanthrope. He had a good sense of humor, which he sometimes turned on himself and his right-wing views. But when he got going on the Communist conspiracy and the John Birch Society's efforts to 'save America', there was no reasoning with him."
