= River Works station =

Commuter rail station in Lynn, Massachusetts

River Works
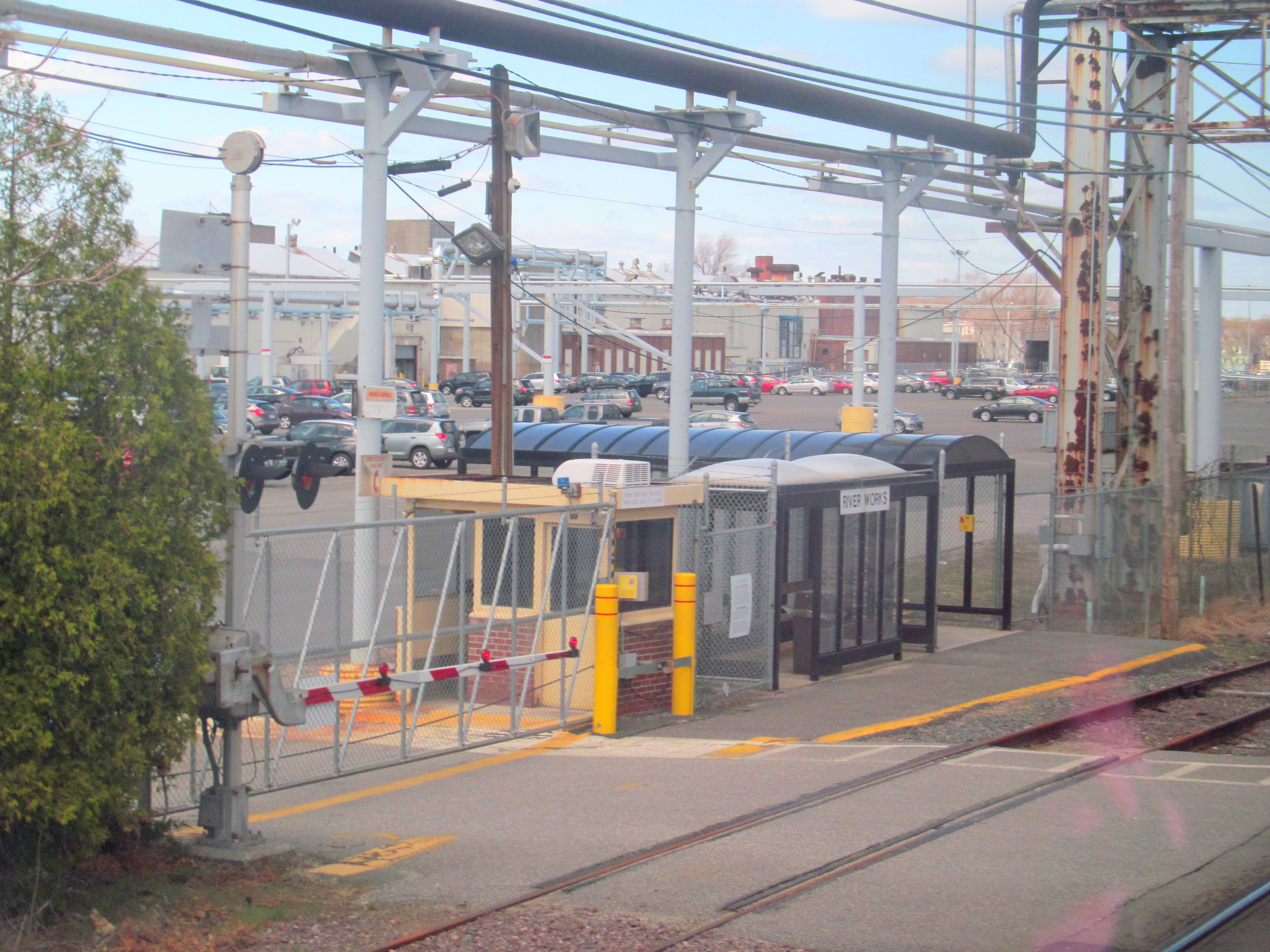
- The inbound platform at River Works in April 2015

General information
- Location: 1000 Western Avenue (Route 107); Lynn, Massachusetts
- Coordinates: 42.45°N 70.97°W
- Line: Eastern Route
- Platforms: 2 side platforms
- Tracks: 2 mainline tracks and 2 sidings

Construction
- Accessible: No

Other information
- Fare zone: 2

History
- Opened: September 9, 1965
- Former names: G.E. Works; G.E. River Works

Passengers
- 2024: 36 daily boardings

Services
Preceding station	MBTA	Following station
Chelsea toward North Station	Newburyport/Rockport Line	Lynn toward Newburyport or Rockport
Proposed services
Preceding station	MBTA	Following station
Wonderland toward Charles/MGH	Blue Line	Lynn Terminus
Location

River Works station (sometimes written Riverworks) is an MBTA Commuter Rail station on the Newburyport/Rockport Line in West Lynn, Massachusetts. The only private station on the system, it is only open to GE Aviation employees who work at the adjacent River Works plant. The station has minimal facilities – two small sections of platform and several shelters – and is not accessible.

The Eastern Railroad and successor Boston and Maine Railroad (B&M) had a West Lynn station at Commercial Street from the mid-19th century to the 1950s; the Boston, Revere Beach and Lynn Railroad had its own West Lynn station nearby from 1875 to 1940. The Thomson-Houston Electric Company opened its factory in West Lynn in 1883; this River Works plant became part of General Electric in 1892. The B&M provided intermittent passenger service to the plant in the early and mid-20th century. The Massachusetts Bay Transportation Authority (MBTA) began funding Eastern Route service in January 1965, and stops at the plant resumed on September 9, 1965. It was not shown on maps until the 1970s and on public timetables until 1989.

River Works station is proposed to be opened to the public and made accessible as part of plans for a development on adjacent land. In May 2017, the developer reached an agreement with the Massachusetts Department of Transportation, although financing had not yet been secured. The location is also a potential station site for a proposed extension of the rapid transit Blue Line to Lynn.

== Station design ==
River Works station is located in the southwest part of West Lynn, Massachusetts, near the Saugus River. The River Works complex surrounds the station on the north and west; an undeveloped site (formerly part of the plant) is located to the east. The Eastern Route has two main tracks through the station site, with freight sidings on both sides. Adjacent to a private grade crossing, short paved segments bracketing the siding tracks serve as side platforms. The station has no high-level platforms and is thus not accessible. Small bus-stop-style shelters are located on each platform; a security gate next to the inbound platform leads to the River Works plant. The station is only open to General Electric employees – the only such private station on the MBTA system.

== History ==
=== West Lynn stations ===
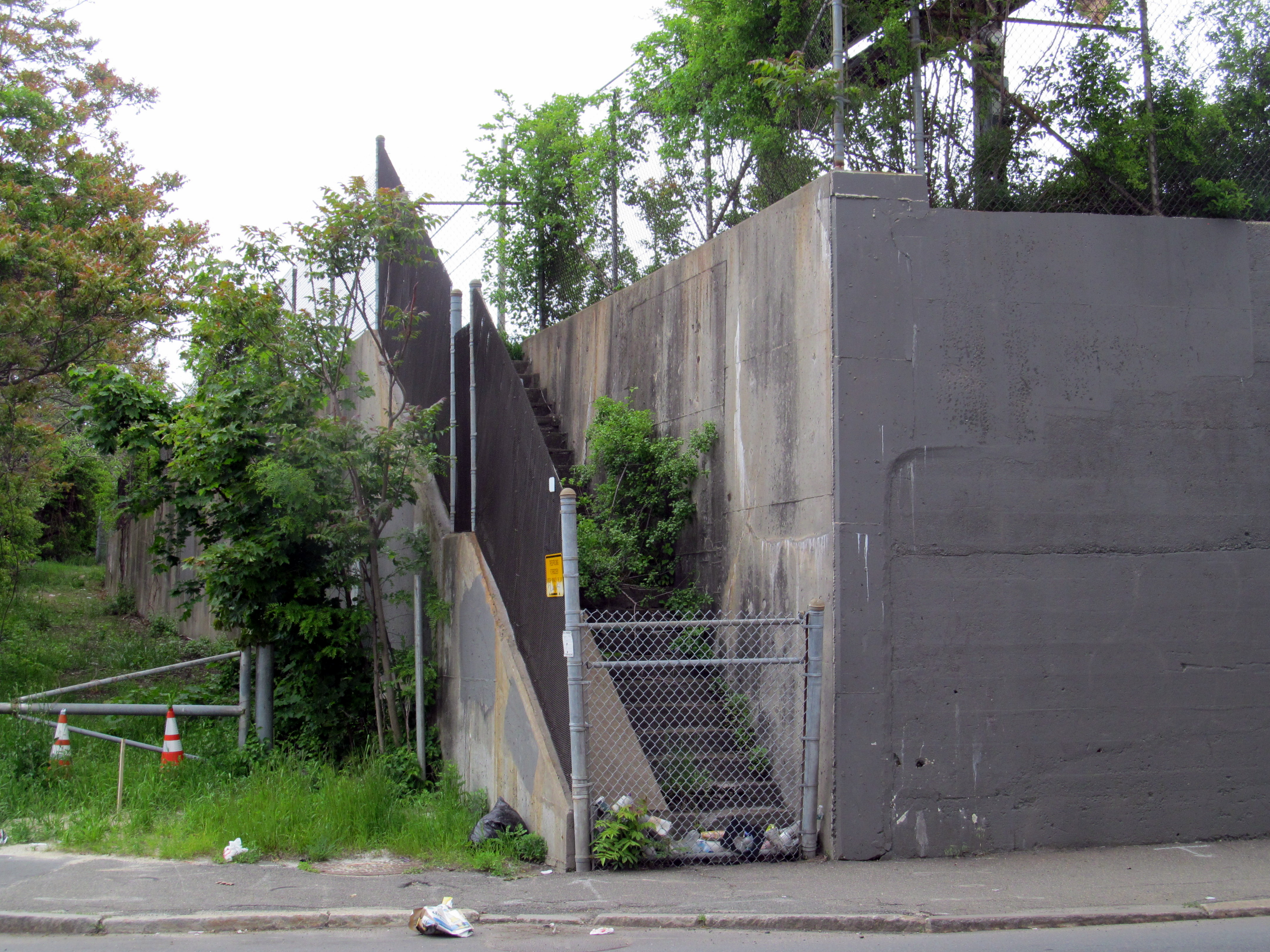
A staircase to the former Eastern Railroad station at West Lynn

The Eastern Railroad was built through Lynn in 1837. The railroad added a West Lynn station at Commercial Street by 1849 to supplement the Central Square station. The 1853-opened Saugus Branch Railroad was acquired by the Eastern Railroad in 1855 and extended from Lynn Common to the Eastern mainline, joining it just south of West Lynn. The Eastern Railroad was acquired by the rival Boston and Maine Railroad (B&M) in 1883, becoming its Eastern Route.

The Boston, Revere Beach and Lynn Railroad (BRB&L) opened on July 28, 1875, running roughly parallel to the Eastern through West Lynn. The BRB&L had its own West Lynn station at Commercial Street, about 250 feet (76 m) southeast of the Eastern's station. Within days, high passenger volumes led the railroad to authorize construction of larger stations at West Lynn, Revere, and Winthrop. Construction of the expanded West Lynn station began in September 1875 and was completed later that year. The station was a boxy two-story wooden structure adjacent to the grade crossing.

The B&M station and several nearby factories were destroyed by a fire on December 6, 1906. A small waiting room was soon constructed on the site. On March 29, 1910, a Boston-bound express train from Portland derailed at the freight yards just west of the station; despite the damage to the locomotive, there were no serious injuries. A 1909–1914 project eliminated grade crossings on the Eastern Route in Lynn. The B&M tracks were raised above Commercial Street, with a new station building constructed slightly to the east.

In 1928, the BRB&L was electrified with pre-pay stations, making it more like a rapid transit line than a conventional railroad. Due to the Great Depression, the BRB&L shut down on January 27, 1940. Most of the closed stations, including West Lynn, were soon demolished. By 1946, the B&M served West Lynn with just two daily round trips. It was closed entirely prior to the 1958 cuts that eliminated Saugus Branch service and all local stops south of Lynn.

=== River Works ===
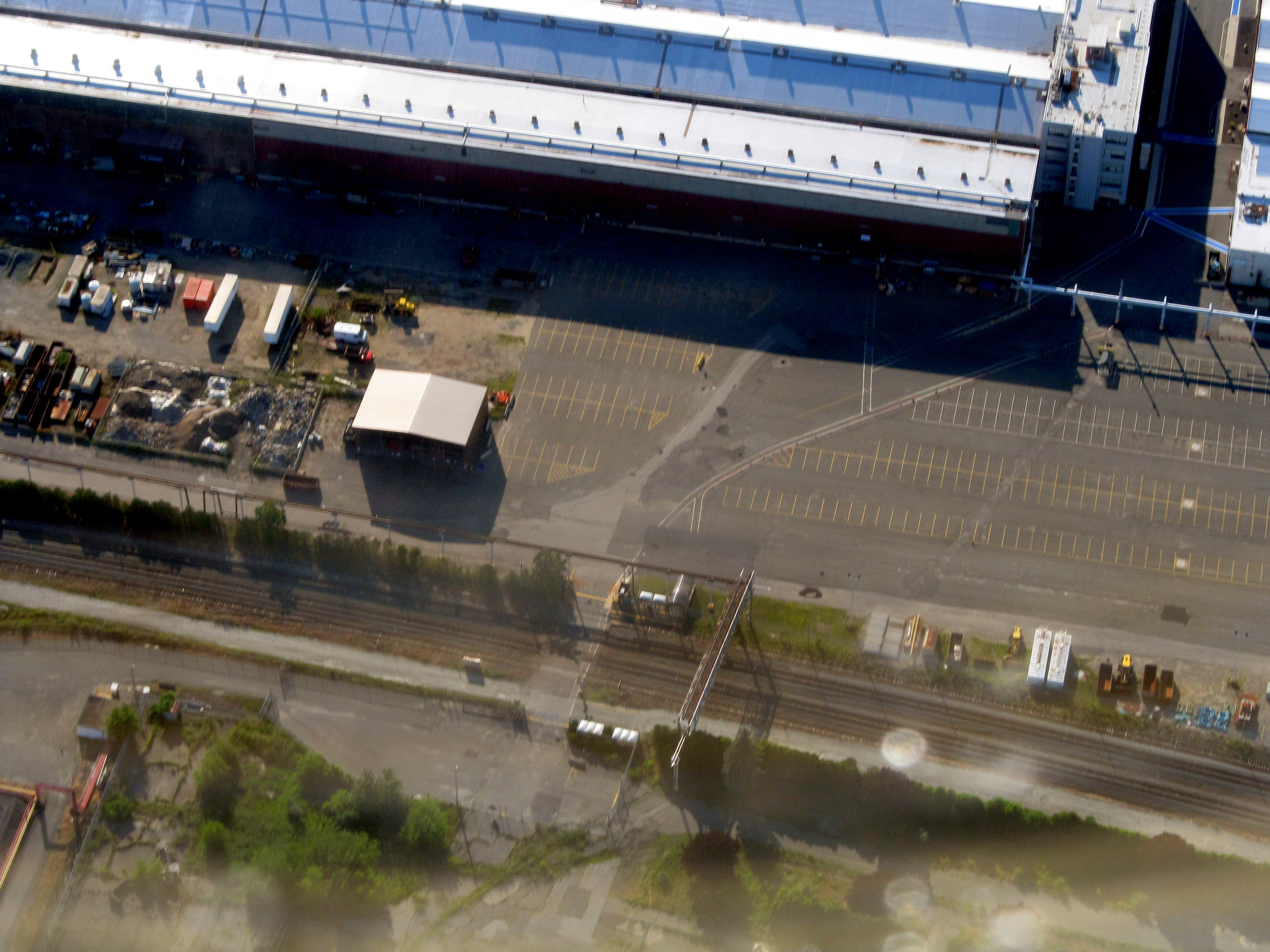
Aerial view of part of the River Works property in July 2016 with the station at bottom center

The Thomson-Houston Electric Company opened its factory in West Lynn in 1883. The River Works plant expanded to a sprawling complex by the time it became part of General Electric in 1892. By 1917, a small number of local trains stopped at River Works, about 1 mile (1.6 km) south of West Lynn; it was gone from timetables by 1929. The plant was expanded during World War II; the stop appeared as a timetable note for two weekday inbound trips in 1946, and one in 1952. It was gone from public timetables by the late 1950s, but appeared again as a timetable note by 1962.

The Massachusetts Bay Transportation Authority (MBTA) was founded in 1964 to subsidize suburban commuter rail service. The agency began funding Eastern Route service in January 1965. Stops at the plant resumed on September 9, 1965. It was not initially shown in public schedules or maps; it later appeared on maps as G.E. Works (1974), G. E. River Works (1976), and River Works (1978), but not in timetables. Not until January 1989 was the station – once again as River Works – regularly listed in public timetables. Ridership has never been high; the station averaged just 7 daily inbound boardings in 1983, and 36 daily boardings in 2024.

Reduced schedules based on existing Saturday service were in effect from March 16 to June 23, 2020, due to the COVID-19 pandemic. These schedules did not initially include River Works and five other limited-service stations not normally served on Saturdays. Service to River Works, but not the other stations resumed on March 23. River Works and Lynn stations were changed from fare Zone 2 to Zone 1A (allowing subway-fare rides to Boston) from May 22–31, 2020, and July 1, 2020 – June 30, 2021 to provide additional travel options during the COVID-19 pandemic (as many of the 400-series bus routes were reduced in frequency) and to examine the impact of temporary fare changes. The change was found to have diverted just 8 daily riders to commuter rail, and the stations reverted to Zone 2 on July 1, 2021. Service on the inner portion of the Newburyport/Rockport Line was suspended for several periods in March–September 2022 to accommodate signal work on the line.

=== Proposed changes ===
The land east of the station was formerly home to General Electric's Gear Plant, which closed in 2011. Four years prior to the closure, the city upzoned the 77-acre (31 ha) site to allow buildings up to 20 stories high in hopes of attracting new commercial development. In July 2014, a developer reached an agreement with GE to buy 65.5 acres (26.5 ha) of the site. The developer, Charles Patsios, indicated that he planned to leave an easement for public access to the station.

Patsios bought the site in October 2014 and opened discussions with MBTA officials about opening River Works station for public use. GE granted the required easement after Patsios purchased the property. He intended to rename the station "Lynnport". To open the station to the public, it would have to be made accessible, with high-level platforms constructed and the tracks relocated. The state was hesitant to pay for such upgrades without proven ridership, and GE would require security considerations before approving the public opening.

The station was proposed in 2016 to be opened only to residents of the planned development, rather than to the public at large. However, under a tentative agreement that the developer reached with the Massachusetts Department of Transportation in February 2017, the rebuilt station would be open to all riders. The full agreement was signed in May 2017, although the development project had not been financed. Under the agreement, the developer would pay for new platforms, 80 parking spaces, and a bus station. In 2024, the city received a $561,000 federal grant for planning of the new station.

Proposals to extend the Blue Line of the MBTA subway to Lynn have considered the possibility of a stop in West Lynn. The 1945 Coolidge Commission report recommended an extension over the BRB&L route, with a West Lynn station at Commercial Street. More recent proposals have considered using either the Eastern Route or the BRB&L alignment, with a possible station at River Works.
