= Harry G. Stoddard =

American businessman

- Stoddard in 1958
- Born: Harry Galpin Stoddard; September 13, 1873; Athol, Massachusetts, USA
- Died: May 21, 1969 (aged 95); Worcester, Massachusetts
- Occupation: Executive
- Known for: President of Wyman-Gordon

Harry Galpin Stoddard (September 13, 1873 – May 21, 1969) was an American businessman who became president of Wyman & Gordon, a major industrial concern, in Worcester, Massachusetts, United States. He was also part owner of the Worcester Telegram, using this paper in the fight against organized crime.

== Biography ==
Stoddard was born in Athol, Massachusetts in 1873, the son of a Baptist minister. The family moved to Worcester in 1884. He attended Becker Business College where he took secretarial courses, then worked as an office boy at a local wire manufacturer, Washburn & Moen Company. Stoddard worked for a while as a salesman, and then in 1902 became works manager of American Steel & Wire. In 1904, at the age of thirty one, he became president of a large iron works in New Jersey employing several thousand workers, holding this position for seven years. In 1911 he returned to Worcester, taking up the position of vice president of Wyman-Gordon, the largest producer of industrial forgings in the country. In 1931 he succeeded George F. Fuller as president of Wyman-Gordon. His son Robert Waring Stoddard succeeded Harry G. Stoddard as president in 1955.

Stoddard was also involved in banking, and in 1925 he and George W. Booth formed a partnership to buy the Worcester Telegram. In 1938 they also bought the assets of the Worcester Evening Post, their only competitor. Booth was a flamboyant and pugnacious journalist, while Stoddard was quiet and preferred to avoid controversy. Despite the difference in temperament, the two worked well together. The paper was outspoken, printing exposés of local Mafia boss Frank Iaconi and mob leader Raymond L.S. Patriarca during the 1930s, 1940s and 1950s.

Harry Stoddard died in 1969. The Stoddards and Wyman-Gordon had a long association with the Worcester Polytechnic Institute (WPI). Wyman-Gordon had been founded by two WPI graduates. The Stoddard Residence Center and the Stoddard Professorship in Management are named for Harry G. Stoddard.
