= Alcoa 50,000-ton forging press =

Heavy press in Cleveland, Ohio, US

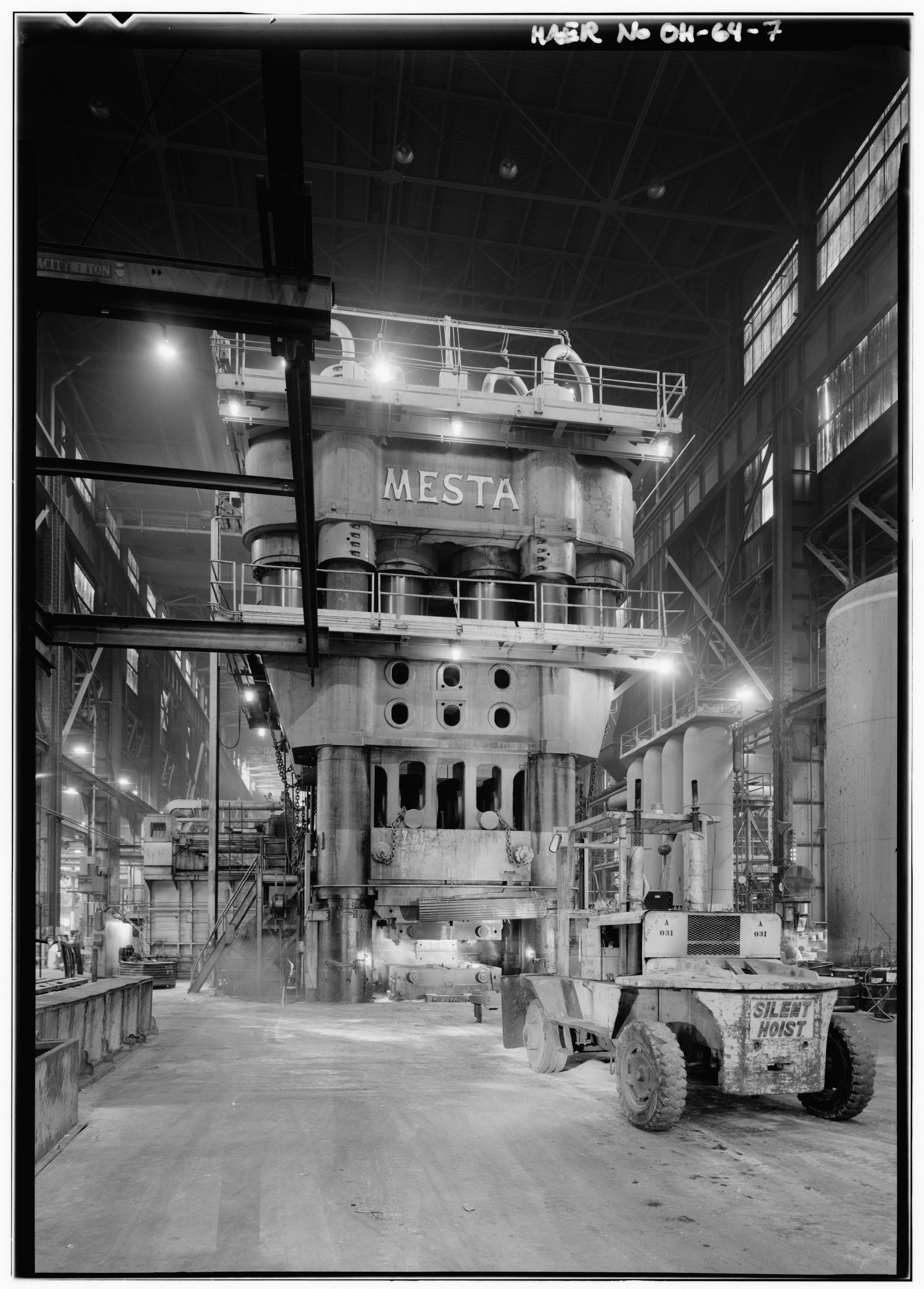
The east side of the press, in 1985

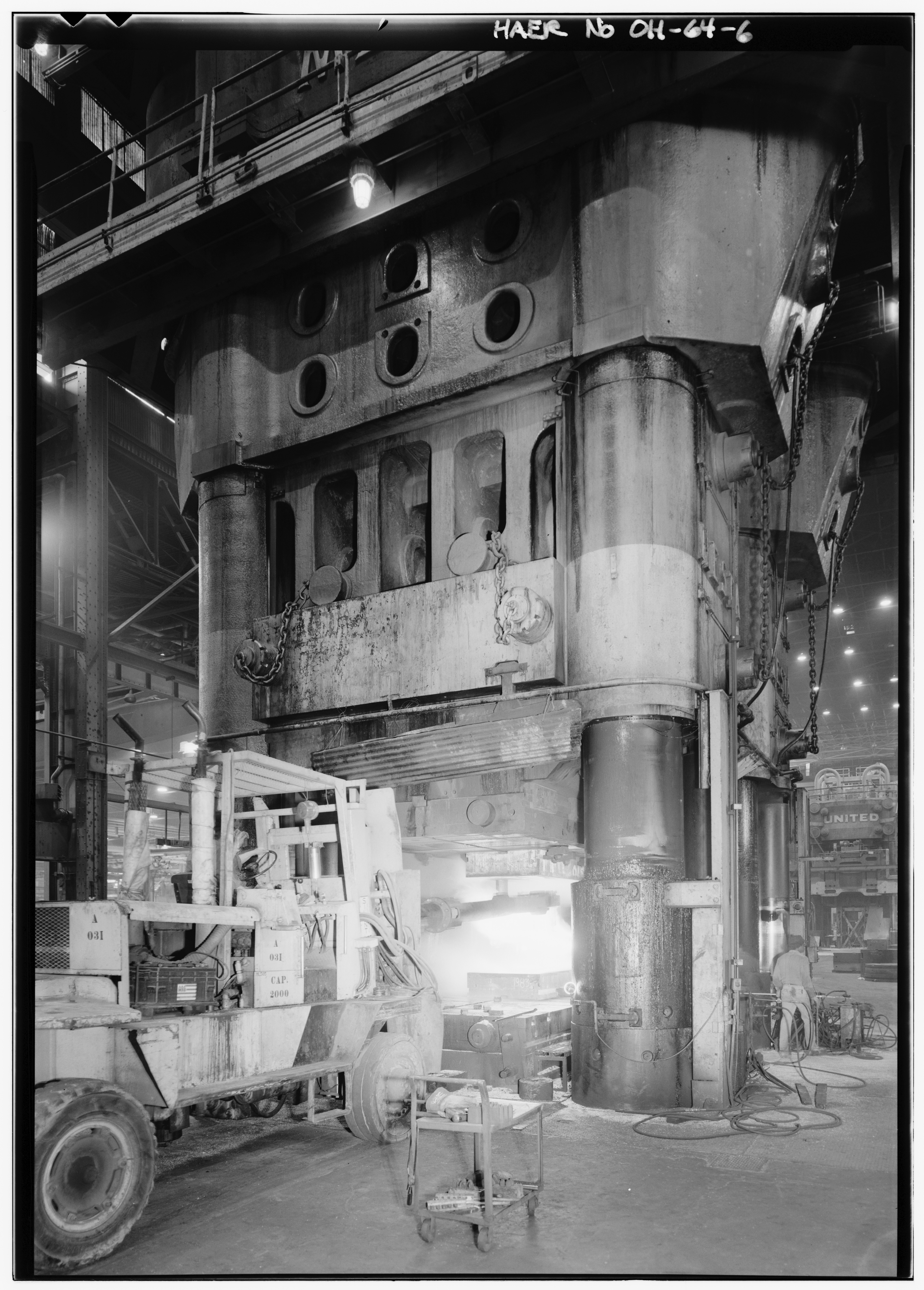
A die being inserted into the east side of the press

The Alcoa 50,000-ton forging press is a heavy press operated at Howmet Aerospace's Cleveland Operations. It was built as part of the Heavy Press Program by the United States Air Force. It was manufactured by Mesta Machinery of West Homestead, Pennsylvania, and began operation on May 5, 1955.

Alcoa ran the plant from the time of its construction, and purchased it outright in 1982. In 2008, cracks were discovered in the press, which had to be shut down for safety reasons. Repairs, originally estimated at a cost of $68 million (equivalent to $102.05 million in 2025), cost a total of $100 million, and were completed in early 2012.

This press was marked a National Historic Mechanical Engineering Landmark by the American Society of Mechanical Engineers in 1981.

== Specifications ==
- Type: Push down
- Height: 87 feet (27 m), 36 feet (11 m) below ground level and 51 feet (16 m) above.
- Weight: approximately 8000 tons
- Stroke: 6 feet (1.8 m)
- Daylight: 15 feet (4.6 m)
- Operating hydraulic pressure: 4,500 psi (31,000 kPa)
- Number of rams: 8
