= River Works =

Plant of General Electric's aviation division

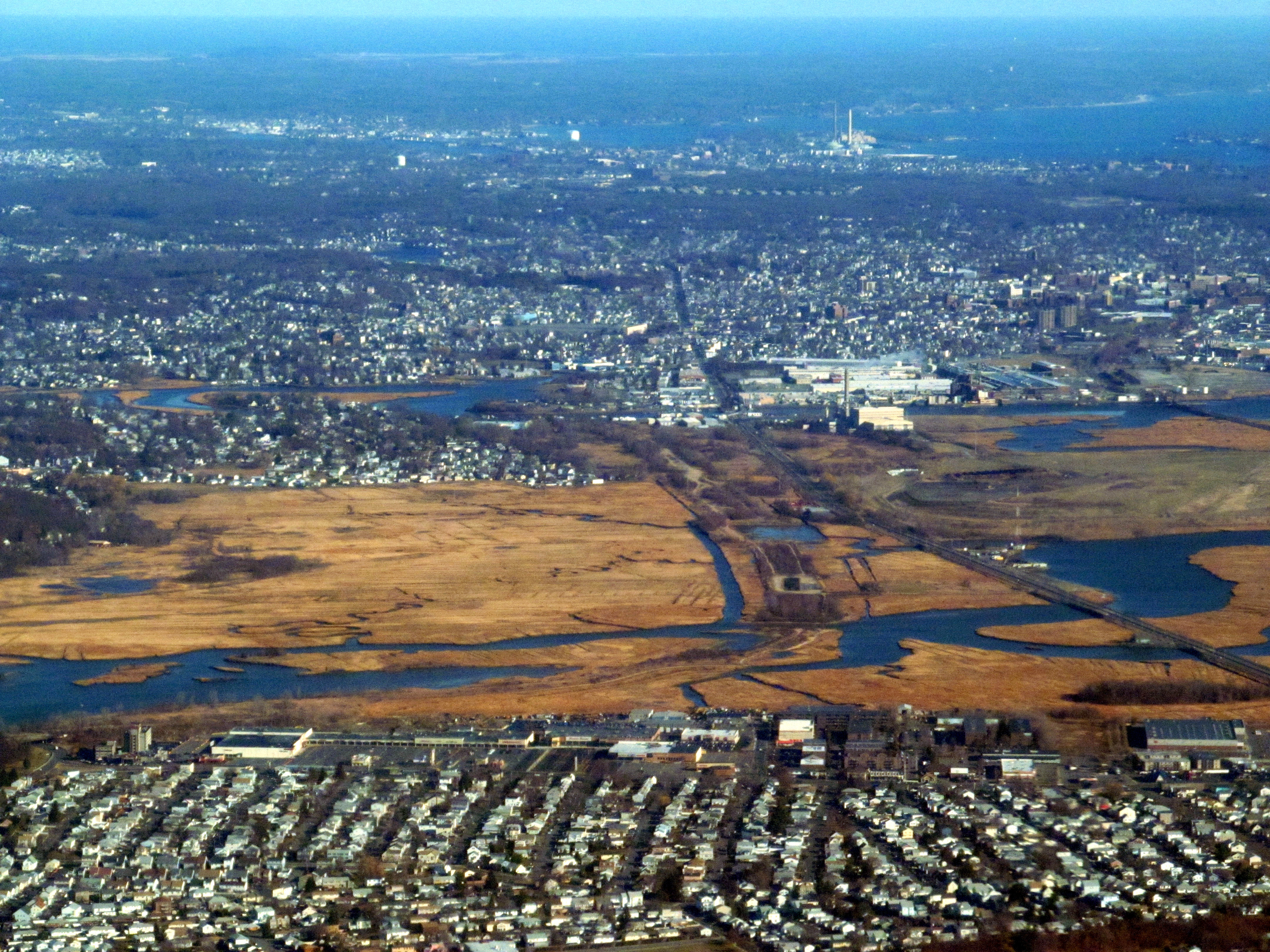
- Aerial view of the Saugus River marshes with River Works near center
- Built: 1943
- Location: Lynn, Massachusetts
- Coordinates: 42°27′5.98″N 70°58′13.83″W

River Works is a plant of General Electric's aviation division located in Lynn, Massachusetts. It is serviced by the River Works station on the MBTA's Newburyport/Rockport Line. It includes the former Air Force Plant 29, which was purchased by General Electric in 1983 from the United States Air Force and is now known as Building 29.

== History ==
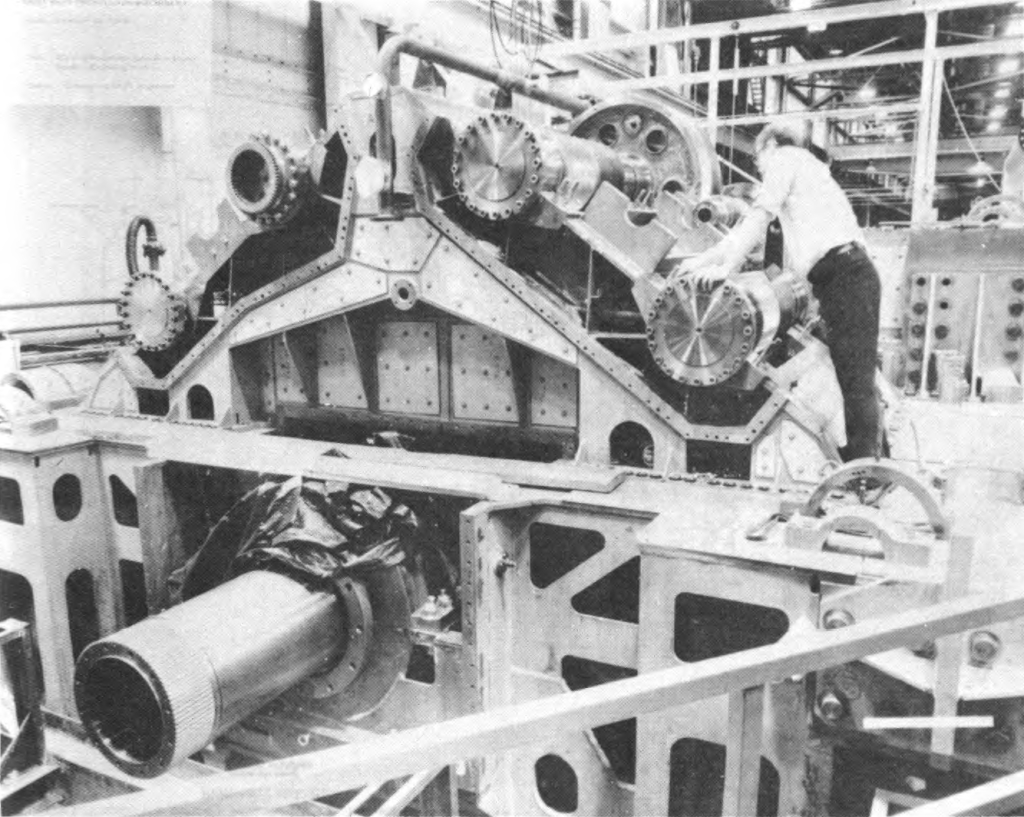
Assembly of the turbines of the USS Ohio (SSGN-726) in 1975

The Thomson-Houston Electric Company moved its operations to a new factory building on Western Avenue in West Lynn in 1883. By 1892, it had expanded into a sprawling factory complex between Western Avenue and the Boston and Maine Railroad Eastern Route tracks. That year, the company merged with Edison General Electric to become General Electric (GE). By 1894, the Lynn plant was known as the "river works" after its position along the Saugus River.

The factory was expanded in 1943 as a supercharger facility (Air Force Plant No. 29), and helped to build the first jet engine during World War II. Activities performed at the plant originally included aircraft engine testing, disassembly, lubricating, cleaning and assembly. Operations included, degreasing, electrochemical grinding, engine maintenance, metal washing, parts cleaning and stress fracture testing.

The workers at the facility were known for leftist politics, joining the new United Electric Workers union in 1936. They were targeted by state and federal governments during the Second Red Scare; in 1954, Joseph McCarthy subpoenaed five employees.

From 1968 to 1972, the 'Pilot Program' was introduced. Faced with rising tensions on the shop floor, bottle-necks in production and low-quality products, GE management tried a scheme of workers' control of production in one area of the plant. Immediate results in increased output and machine utilisation, and a reduction on manufacturing losses but was eventually terminated by the management. The plant had operations boosted in the late 1980s after General Electric decided to close the General Electric Everett Plant and move operations there.
