= Heavy Press Program =

US Air Force building program

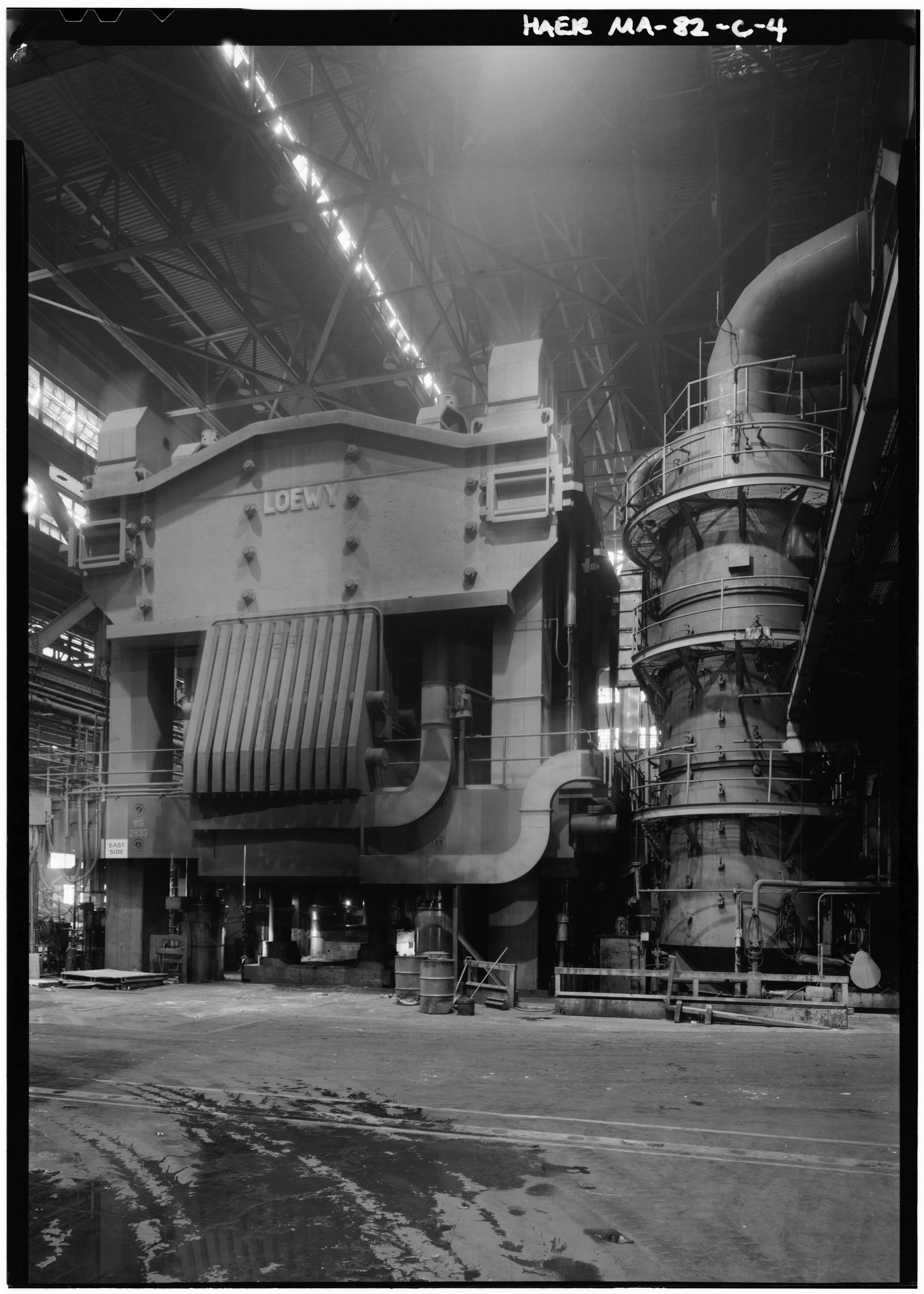
The Wyman-Gordon 50,000-ton forging press

The Heavy Press Program was a Cold War-era program of the United States Air Force to build the largest forging presses and extrusion presses in the world. These machines greatly enhanced the US defense industry's capacity to forge large complex components out of light alloys, such as magnesium and aluminum. The program began in 1944 and concluded in 1957 after construction of four forging presses and six extruders, at an overall cost of $279 million. Six of them are still in operation today, manufacturing structural parts for military and commercial aircraft. They still hold the records for size in North America, though they have since been surpassed by presses in Japan, France, Russia and China.

The program produced ten machines, listed below.

== Background ==
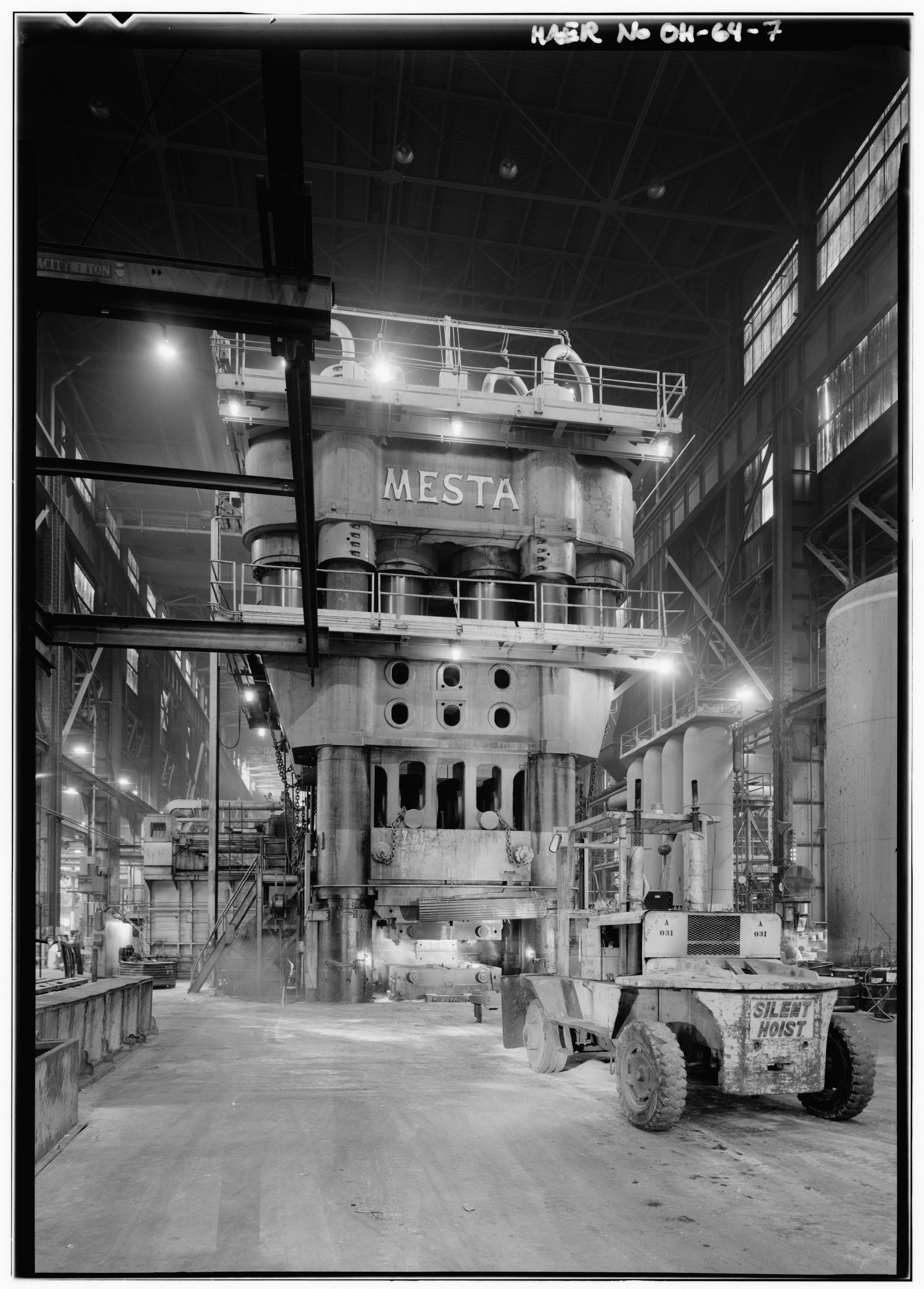
The Alcoa 50,000-ton forging press

The Heavy Press Program was motivated by experiences from World War II. Nazi Germany held the largest heavy die forging presses during the war, and translated this advantage into high performance jet fighters. Because of the shortage of aluminum, German aircraft manufacturers used forged magnesium structural components, formed to shape in closed-die hydraulic presses. After finding this, in 1944, the Federal Government asked Wyman-Gordon for assistance, and this program evolved into the Heavy Press Program. Work was started on an 18,000 ton press, built by Mesta Machinery, which was completed in 1946 at the Wyman-Gordon Grafton Plant. Post-war, the Soviet Union captured the largest German press to survive the war, with a capacity of 33,000 ton, and were suspected to have seized the designs for an even larger 55,000 ton press. The next two largest units were captured by the United States and brought across the Atlantic Ocean, but they were half the size at 16,500 ton. As Cold War fears developed, American strategists worried that this would give the Soviet Air Force a crucial advantage and designed the Heavy Press Program to help win the arms race.

Seventeen presses were originally planned with an expected cost of $389 million, but the project was scaled back to 10 presses in 1953.

Air Force Lieutenant General Kenneth B. Wolfe was the primary advocate for the Heavy Press Program. Alexander Zeitlin was another prominent figure of the program.

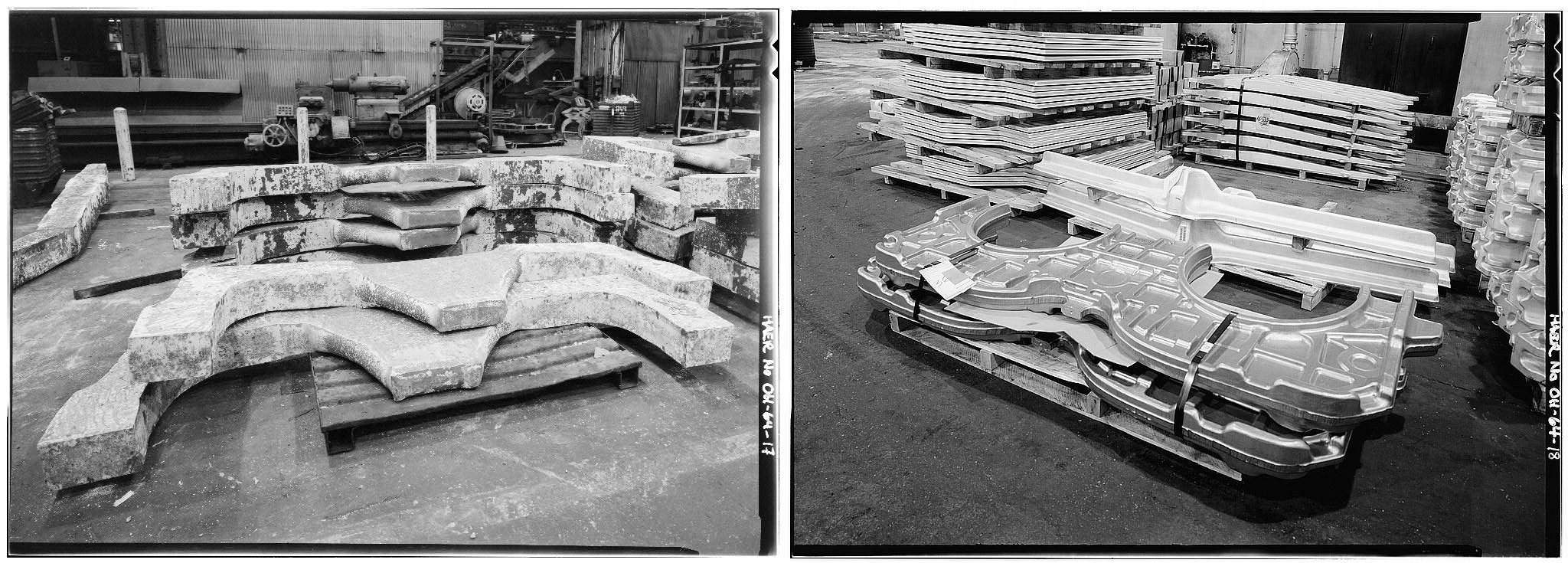
Titanium bulkheads for the F-15 jet fighter before and after pressing by the Alcoa 50,000 ton press

== Presses ==
| Capacity (short tons) | Type of press | Built by | Operated by | Location | Began Operation |
|---|---|---|---|---|---|
| 13,200 | extrusion | Schloemann | Alcoa | Lafayette, Indiana | 1953 |
| 50,000 | forging | Mesta Machinery | Alcoa | Air Force Plant 47, 1600 Harvard Avenue, Cleveland, Ohio | May 5, 1955 |
| 35,000 | forging | United Engineering | Alcoa | Air Force Plant 47, 1600 Harvard Avenue, Cleveland, Ohio | 1955 |
| 8,000 | extrusion | Loewy Hydropress | Kaiser Aluminum | 1954 Halethorpe Farms Road, Halethorpe, Maryland | 1955 (Scrapped 2021 following facility closure by Arconic) |
| 8,000 | extrusion | Loewy Hydropress | Kaiser Aluminum | 1954 Halethorpe Farms Road, Halethorpe, Maryland | 1955 (Scrapped 2021 following facility closure by Arconic) |
| 8,000 | extrusion | Loewy Hydropress | Harvey Machine Co. | Torrance, California | May 1946 (Scrapped 1992) |
| 12,000 | extrusion | Lombard Corporation | Harvey Machine Co. | Torrance, California | August 1957 (Scrapped 1990s.) |
| 50,000 | forging | Loewy Hydropress | Wyman-Gordon | Air Force Plant 63, Grafton, Massachusetts | October 1955 |
| 35,000 | forging | Loewy Hydropress | Wyman-Gordon | Air Force Plant 63, Grafton, Massachusetts | February 1955 |
| 12,000 | extrusion | Loewy Hydropress | Curtiss-Wright | Buffalo, New York Relocated to Houston, Texas | |

== Landmark designation ==
The American Society of Mechanical Engineers designated the 50,000-ton Alcoa and Wyman-Gordon presses as Historic Mechanical Engineering Landmarks. The Alcoa press weighs 8,000 tons and is 87 feet (27 meters) tall. The die table is 26 by 12 feet (7.9 by 3.7 meters), and the maximum stroke is 6 feet (1.8 meters).
