= Air Force Plant PJKS =

Coordinates: 39.5091°N 105.1223°W

Air Force Plant Peter J. Kiewit and Sons (AFP PJKS, AFP #79) is a Formerly Used Defense Site (CO7570090038) at the Colorado Front Range and used during the Cold War (1957-1968) to provide "rocket assembly, engine testing, and research and development") for the Titan missile complexes southeast of Denver (construction began April 1959). The 464 acres (188 ha) of former "Martin Missile Test Site 1" was "deeded" to the USAF in 1957, was subsequently operated by the builder (Glenn L. Martin Company), was listed on the EPA's National Priorities List on November 21, 1989; and remained USAF property until transferred to Lockheed Martin in February 2001. The site is used by, and entirely within, the secure Lockheed Martin/United Launch Alliance Waterton Canyon facility of 5,200 acres (2,100 ha) that produces Titan IV launch vehicles and the GPS III space vehicles. Entirely within the East Fork Brush Creek watershed, the former USAF firearms ranges used by PJKS military police remains along the creek, is managed by the Skyline Hunting and Fishing Club, and is used for periodic Jefferson County police and local Boy Scout training.

HGM-25A Titan I ICBMs were liquid-fueled rockets using LOX/RP-1 propellant which required the missiles to periodically be removed from the launch silos for servicing. Environmental sites at PJKS include 59 within six operable units (e.g., OU1, OU4, & OU6), and there are six areas of concern (12 of 14 underground tanks have been removed). Groundwater contaminants include trichloroethene (TCE), hydrazine, vinyl chloride, benzene, and nitrate. In fiscal year 1996, "technical work groups were formed with EPA, the State of Colorado, USGS, and the U.S. Army Corps of Engineers to support RI site characterization and risk assessment."
