= International Titanium Inc. =

International Titanium is located in Moses Lake, Washington.

In the 1980s a controlling majority of shares was purchased by the Wyman-Gordon Company.
