= Wyman-Gordon =

American metal component manufacturer

- Type: Subsidiary
- Industry: Manufacturing
- Founded: 1883; 143 years ago in Worcester, Massachusetts
- Founder: Horace Wyman; Lyman Gordon
- Headquarters: Houston, Texas, United States
- Products: Complex metal components
- Revenue: US$752.9 million (FY 1998)
- Owner: Berkshire Hathaway (since 2016)
- Number of employees: 2,500
- Parent: Precision Castparts Corp. (since 2000)
- Website: www.wyman-gordon.com

Wyman-Gordon is a company that designs and manufactures complex metal components. Founded in 1883 as a manufacturer of crankshafts for looms, it has a long history of making forged metal components, particularly for the aerospace industry. Wyman-Gordon is a wholly owned subsidiary of Precision Castparts Corp., and is based in Houston, Texas. It has thirteen (13) plants in five countries, and employed about 2,500 people as of 2012.

Wyman-Gordon is now ultimately owned by Warren Buffett’s Berkshire Hathaway as a result of the latter company’s acquisition of PCC in January 2016.

== History ==
=== Early years ===
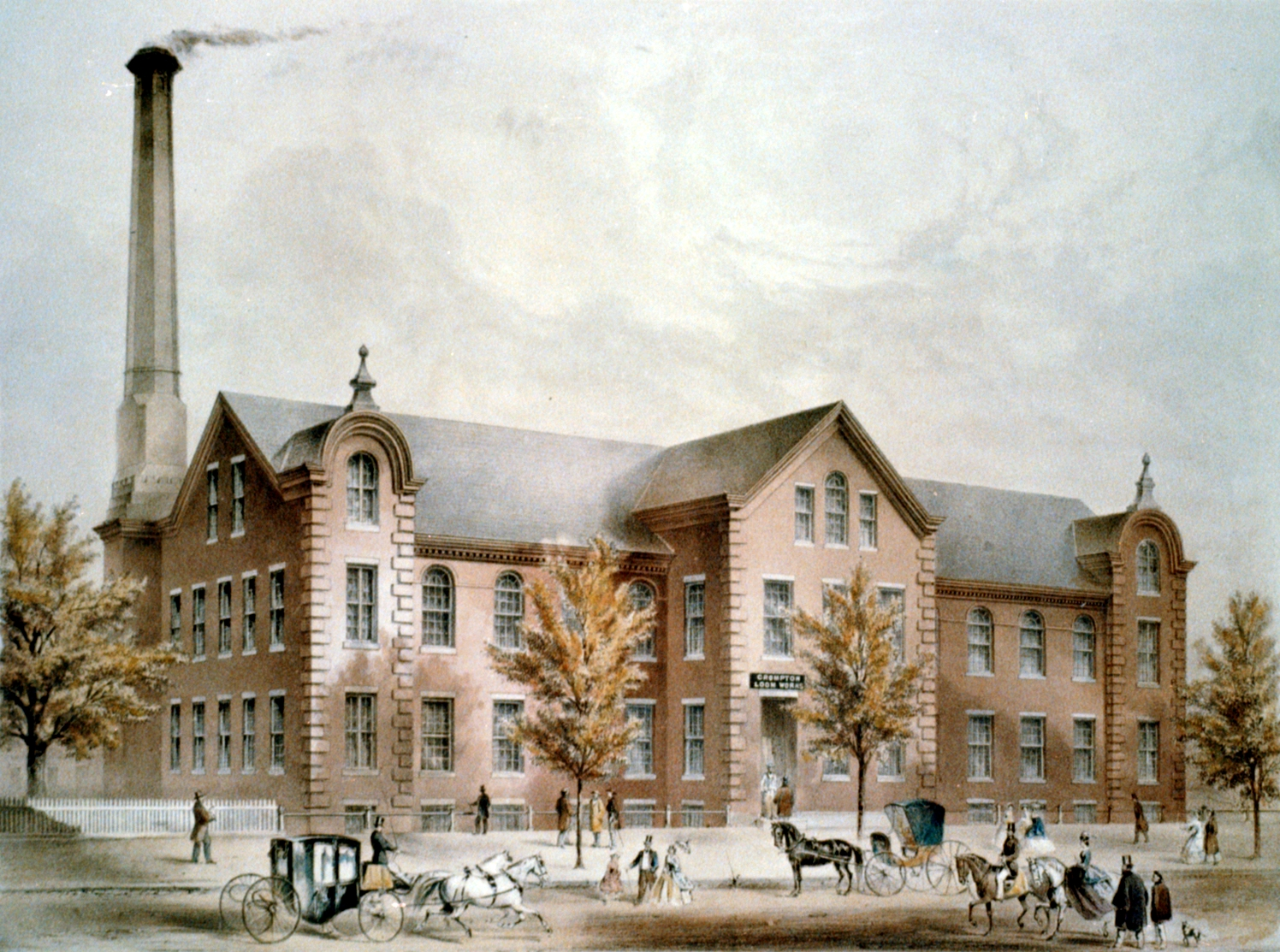
The Crompton Loom Works in Worcester, Massachusetts was the first customer of Wyman and Gordon's new company.

The Worcester Drop Forge Works was founded in Worcester, Massachusetts, in 1883 by Horace Wyman and Lyman Gordon. It was later renamed the Wyman-Gordon Company. The company began with eight people in a small wooden factory building, forging crankshafts for looms. A 50-horsepower steam engine provided power for the drop hammers and other equipment. The fathers of the founders were both managers at the Crompton Loom Works and helped their sons' business win contracts for the crankshafts and for pistol and micrometer components.

The company won contracts from railroads for automatic couplers and from bicycle manufacturers for sprockets, spindles, and pedals, having gained a reputation for the high quality of its early work. From around 1902, it also began filling orders for crankshafts from manufacturers of the recently invented automobile. Horace Wyman died in 1905 and Lyman Gordon in 1914; George F. Fuller (1869–1962) succeeded to the company presidency upon Gordon's death. Fuller had joined the company as an accountant, but had invented several ways to improve the quality of the forged metal components. The company grew steadily under his leadership.

=== Growth with the aerospace industry ===
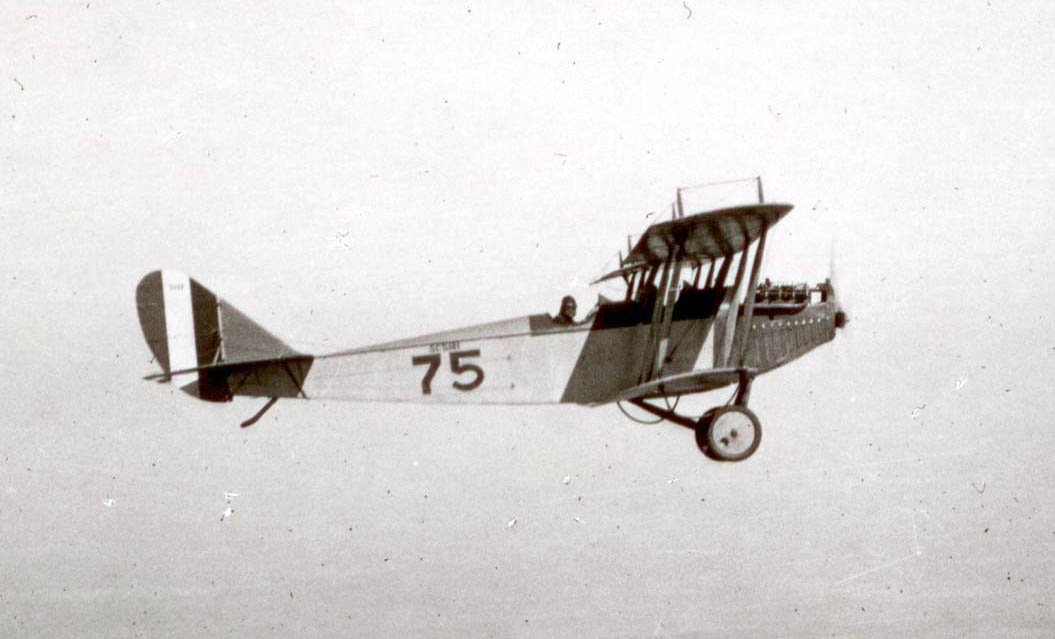
A Curtiss JN-4 (Jenny) on a training flight during World War I (1918), using Wyman-Gordon components

When World War I broke out, the U.S. government contracted with Wyman-Gordon to supply forgings for the 90-horsepower engines of Curtis Jenny biplanes. This was followed by contracts to produce airframe and engine forgings for almost all U.S. military aircraft. Wyman-Gordon maintained a close relationship with manufacturers of commercial and military airplanes after the war, making growing numbers of parts for engines, crankshafts, propellers, airframes, and landing gear. The company expanded the Worcester factory and opened a new plant in Harvey, Illinois.

During World War II (1939–1945) the company expanded again to supply many types of forged components to airplane manufacturers. Every American plane in combat service included Wyman-Gordon components.

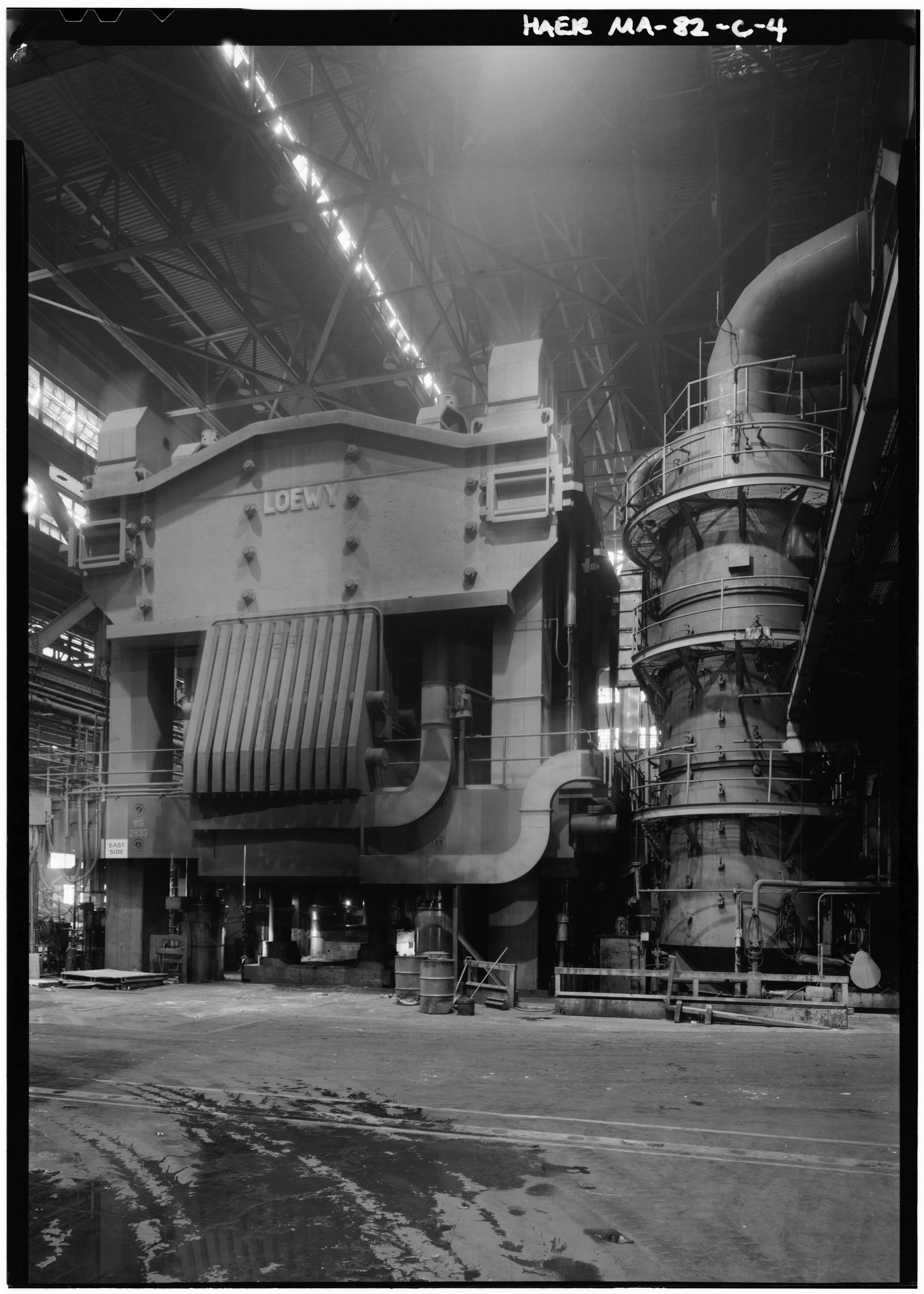
A 50,000-ton press in Grafton, Massachusetts, put into use by the company in 1955

In 1944, Wyman-Gordon was chosen to receive an 18,000-ton closed-die hydraulic press, the largest in the United States. The War Production Board had found from captured airplanes that Germany had larger presses than U.S. engineers had thought practical, and was using that equipment to forge large aircraft components from lightweight magnesium. Seeking to replicate this capability in the U.S., the War Production Board contracted with the Mesta Machine Co. of Pittsburgh to fabricate a new large press to be operated by Wyman-Gordon. A new plant was built around the press in North Grafton, Massachusetts, completed after the war in 1946.

The introduction of jet engines in the years after World War II caused a drastic switch in requirements, demanding fewer forgings, but forgings that were larger, lighter, stronger and more tolerant of heat than anything made so far. The new components produced by Wyman-Gordon were of much greater value, compensating for their decreased number.

The Korean War stimulated demand for new airplanes, requiring even larger components than could be built by the North Grafton press. In 1951, construction began on a plant that opened in 1955 with two presses, one with 35,000 tons of force and the other 50,000 tons. The 50,000-ton press was the largest machine in the world at the time, 10 stories high and with foundations extending 100 ft (30 m) into bedrock. In 1983, the American Society of Mechanical Engineers designated the 50,000-ton forging press in North Grafton as a National Historic Mechanical Engineering Landmark.

Wyman-Gordon was a pioneer in forging titanium, with the first main use being for compressor disks in Pratt & Whitney engines. Westinghouse and General Electric also used the company's titanium forgings, and its products were used in building the engine of the LGM-30 Minuteman missile. Demand continued to grow during the 1960s and 1970s, with military demand due to the Vietnam war and growing demand from commercial civilian airplane manufacturers. The support beam for the Boeing 747 landing gear was larger than any closed-die titanium forging that had ever been made in the past.

In 1980, Wyman-Gordon was hit by a severe shortage of titanium that hurt its ability to fulfil orders for hundreds of types of aircraft. In the early 1980s, the company bought International Titanium, a company based in Moses Lake, Washington, built a state-of-the-art facility for International Titanium to produce titanium sponge, and built a new facility in Millbury, Massachusetts, to alloy the sponge with other metals. Because the company now had complete control of its supply chain, customers were more certain of Wyman-Gordon's delivery capability, leading to increased orders.

=== Other aspects ===
Harry G. Stoddard became a vice president of Wyman-Gordon in 1911 and was appointed President in 1931. He also had interests in banking and was part owner of the Worcester Telegram. His son Robert Waring Stoddard joined the company in 1929 and succeeded Harry G. Stoddard as president in 1955, holding that position until being elected chairman in 1967. He was one of the founders of the right-wing and anticommunist John Birch Society. Stoddard was opposed to the Civil Rights Act of 1964, which would make racial discrimination illegal. In 1964, the company employed black workers only as janitors. Abbie Hoffman was the press officer for a group of civil-rights agitators who targeted the Worcester plant for picketing. Later, they filed petitions with the Massachusetts Commission Against Discrimination and the U.S. Air Force. In July that year the company agreed to change its hiring practices.

As late as the 1970s, Wyman-Gordon was a major player in automotive forging. Due to growth of international competition in this market, the company decided to focus on aerospace. Wyman-Gordon India, a joint venture, went public in February 1962. In 1964, Wyman-Gordon India started mass production of forged steel crankshafts and other components for an Indian-made jeep that Mahindra & Mahindra was manufacturing. This was the first time crankshafts had been produced in India. Later the company changed its name to WG Forge & Allied Industries Limited. In the long run, the company was not successful. It was referred to the Board for Industrial and Financial Reconstruction, which tried to revive it, but without success. In 1992, it went into liquidation.

=== Difficulties and acquisition ===
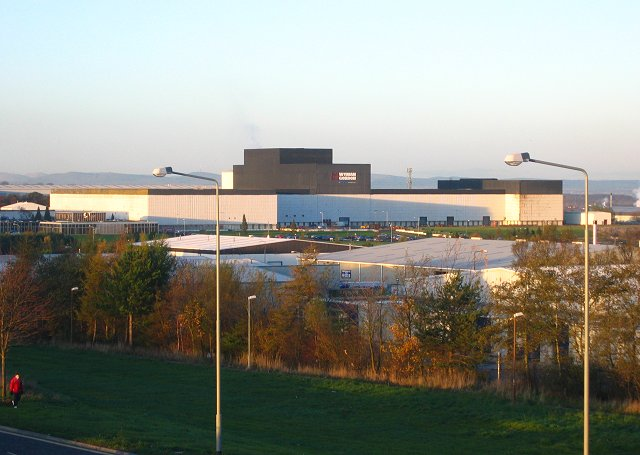
Wyman-Gordon plant, Houston Industrial Estate, West Lothian, Scotland

In the late 1980s, the need for military components was reduced as the Cold War ended, coupled with a decline in demand for commercial aircraft parts. By 1993, the aerospace industry was just 60% of its size in the mid-1980s. Wyman-Gordon had to lay off employees. Despite financial difficulties, in March 1992, the company announced a joint venture with Pratt & Whitney and Perth, Western Australia-based Western Aerospace to form Western Australian Speciality Alloys. The new company would process Australian ores into nickel-based superalloys at a new plant at Canning Vale, near Perth. These alloys are designed to handle extreme heat (as in jet engines) and are extremely durable. Wyman-Gordon also acquired PFI investment cast facilities (1988), Arwood investment cast facilities (1990), and Cameron Forge (1994).

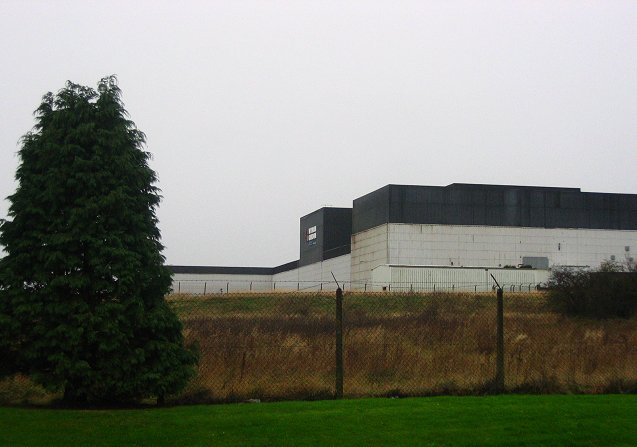
Another view of the enormous building that can be seen from most of West Lothian

In May 1999, Precision Castparts Corporation agreed to pay $721 million for Wyman-Gordon, while also assuming $104 million in debt. The combined company would be able to supply both castings and forgings for airplane engines. The purchase would have potentially reduced competition in the industry. To gain approval for the deal from the Federal Trade Commission, PCC was required to divest two of Wyman-Gordon's foundries, one in Albany, Oregon, and the other in Groton, Connecticut. The acquisition was completed on 12 January 2000. At least in the short term, it was planned that Wyman-Gordon would retain a separate identity.

=== Recent years ===
In April 2000, PCC announced that it was closing Wyman-Gordon's Buffalo, New York, pipe-making plant. The 12,000-ton extrusion press would be moved to the Wyman-Gordon facility in Houston. By consolidating production in one plant, the company would cut costs and speed up the production cycle. Wyman-Gordon purchased the UEF aerospace division of United Engineering Forgings in May 2000 for £22m, calling the new subsidiary Wyman Gordon Lincoln. The division based in Lincoln, England, makes forged engine discs, engine shafts, and components of airframes and landing-gear. Its main customer is Rolls-Royce.

In 2000, Wyman-Gordon built a manufacturing facility in Plzeň, Czech Republic. The 5,400 m^{2} (58,000 sq ft) plant makes titanium, nickel, and steel alloy rotary parts for the power generation and aerospace industries, using immersion ultrasound to test the products. In December 2000, Wyman-Gordon acquired the Drop Dies and Forging Company, which had been founded in 1919 by Joseph F. Rice. In January 2011, it was reported that Wyman-Gordon had expressed interest in a joint venture with Bharat Heavy Electricals Limited to manufacture boiler tubes in India.

Wyman-Gordon serves the marine, aerospace, power, fuel, and construction industries. It uses forging and extrusion presses that are among the world's largest, including a 35,000-ton press in Houston and a 30,000-ton press in Livingston, coupled with custom-made dies to produce various complex components. Its plants process steel, titanium, and nickel-based materials, among others.

== See also ==
- Heavy Press Program
