= Ampco Pittsburgh =

Steel manufacturer

Ampco-Pittsburgh Corporation
- Company type: Public
- Traded as: NYSE: AP; Russell Microcap Index component
- Industry: Steel
- Founded: 1929
- Headquarters: Pittsburgh, Pennsylvania
- Key people: John S. Stanik, CEO
- Products: rolled steel steel plating coils pumps
- Revenue: ▲US$299M (FY 2009)
- Operating income: ▲US$46.7M (FY 2009)
- Net income: ▲US$27.8M (FY 2009)
- Total assets: ▼US$472M (FY 2009)
- Total equity: ▲US$179M (FY 2009)
- Number of employees: 1,300
- Website: www.ampcopgh.com

Ampco-Pittsburgh Corporation (American Metal Products Company) is a specialty steel manufacturer headquartered in Downtown Pittsburgh, Pennsylvania. It is one of several companies to bear the Ampco name, and it should not be confused with the Milwaukee-based copper base alloy producer, Ampco Metal Inc.; the Miami-based cabinetry company; the Swiss aluminum corporation; or the Dallas-based tool company. Ampco was formed in 1929 and is a conglomerate made up of several previously established small steel makers. Five small companies operate under the Ampco umbrella in two different product segments.

== About the Company ==
The Forged and Cast Products portion of the corporation is represented by Union Electric Steel and Union Electric Åkers. Union Electric manufactures specialty forged and cast products, including steel work rolls, which are used in the rolling process of making many metals. The Union Electric Åkers subsidiary offers a variety of grades of thickness and hardness for the product.

The Air and Liquid Processing Segment of the company comprises Aerofin, Buffalo Air Handling, and Buffalo Pumps. Aerofin creates steel coils for use industrially in power plants and oil extraction and commercially in automobiles, and heating/cooling systems. Under Buffalo Air Handling, metal plating, parts, and fans for huge ventilation and refrigeration systems are manufactured. Buffalo Pumps is the maker of a variety of pumps for various industries.

In 2008, their chairman & former CEO, Robert Paul, became a minority partner in the Pittsburgh Steelers, purchasing a minority stake in order to keep controlling ownership within the Rooney family. Paul and his family acquired a 16% stake in the team as part of the deal, though the Rooneys will remain as primary owners.
