= Crons =

American sportswear brand

- Product type: Athletic apparel
- Current owner: Cavanaugh Promotions
- Country: United States
- Introduced: 1996
- Ambassador: Pittsburgh Penguins

The Crons brand is a product of a privately held American company, Cavanaugh Promotions, based in Pittsburgh, Pennsylvania. The company designs motivational athletic apparel with logos which encourage people to achieve their goals through hard work, practice and preparation.

== History ==
Cavanaugh Promotions and the Crons brand was founded in 1996 by Pat Cavanaugh. who had previously played basketball at the University of Pittsburgh. In 2006 the company began actively promoting the brand, selling to high schools, athletic organizations, smaller colleges and smaller professional teams, and over the next four years to larger colleges and conferences.".

== Business activities ==
Crons provides team apparel such as uniforms, practice gear, warm-ups, workout apparel, travel gear and coaches' apparel. Much of that gear includes motivational messaging in various locations. The brand has supplied uniforms to several teams in the NCAA Basketball Championships. Robert Morris University and University of North Carolina-Asheville have each worn its uniforms in the Tournament. The brand designed and produced new uniforms for the Tournament for UNC-Asheville in 2012.

The brand added Protein Bars to its product line in Spring 2010. They are sold in several large retail store chains in twelve countries.

In the fall of 2011, The Crons Brand became the Official Motivation Brand of the Pittsburgh Penguins, selling its apparel in the Consol Energy Center and becoming the outfitter for the team's youth hockey camps.
