= George F. Fuller =

American industrialist

George Freeman Fuller
- Born: 1869; Grafton, Massachusetts
- Died: 1962 (aged 92–93)
- Occupation: Accountant
- Known for: President of Wyman-Gordon, Philanthropist

George Freeman Fuller (1869–1962) was a 20th-century industrialist in Worcester, Massachusetts, United States who became president of the Wyman-Gordon company. He was also famous for his philanthropic foundation.

== Life ==
Fuller was born in Grafton, Massachusetts in 1869. He had one younger sister. His father was a Civil War veteran, who after the war found work in a shoe-making factory. Service in the war caused Fuller's father to suffer lifelong health problems, issues that eventually led to his death in 1880. George Fuller was only eighteen years old. In the years after his father's death, Fuller assumed financial responsibility for his sister and widowed mother. Though he had the aptitude and desire to go to college, he put the idea aside in an effort to support his family. He took a job at the Worcester Drop Forge Works where he worked as an accountant. The Worcester Drop Forge Works would soon become the Wyman-Gordon Company, which became a leading manufacturer of bicycle parts, railroad couplers, copper wire, and automobile and aircraft parts. It would be in Wyman-Gordon Company that George Fuller would make his name.

In 1919, after the death of company founder Lyman Gordon, George Fuller was named president and treasurer of the Wyman-Gordon Company. He had already done much to improve the “quality and durability of forged metal.” His most famous and successful accomplishment was to develop a heat treating process making steel strong enough to be used in train couplings and the first automobile crankshafts. As president of the Wyman-Gordon Company, Fuller is generally considered, along with Worcester Lunch Car Company founder Charles Palmer, a pioneer of the second wave of industry in Worcester, turning the city into a manufacturing center. Fuller also served as a director of the Mechanics National Bank of Worcester. In 1931 Fuller was succeeded by Harry G. Stoddard as president of Wyman-Gordon. He was a trustee of Worcester Polytechnic Institute for decades, starting in 1920.

== Family ==
George Fuller married Sybil H. Fuller in 1893. Mrs. Fuller was originally from Boylston, MA. They had no children, though Mrs. Fuller had a deep and lasting impact on area charities and philanthropies. Sybil Fuller was eighty-two when she died in 1955. George Fuller was ninety-three when he died in 1962.

== Legacy ==
The George F. and Sybil H. Fuller Foundation is still a leading philanthropic organization in the City of Worcester. The Foundation allocates money for cultural, educational, health care, social service projects. The George F. Fuller Research Library is named for him. In 2010 the organization's assets were $52,105,655, and it made payments on 121 grants. It also granted $2.8 million for capital projects. The George F. and Sybil H. Fuller Foundation Scholarship offers ten $1,000 higher education scholarships for students in need. The student center at Quinsigamond Community College is also named for Fuller.

The Fuller Foundation has provided much support to the Worcester Polytechnic Institute (WPI). In 1964 it provided an endowment for the George F. Fuller Professorship in Mechanical Engineering. The foundation continues to support annual scholarships for students from the Worcester area attending WPI. Gifts from the foundation supported the Fuller Residence Center, Fuller Water Quality Laboratory, George F. Fuller Laboratories, and the Fuller Chemistry Complex. The George F. and Sybil H. Fuller Atrium in WPI's new Sports and Recreation Center opened in August 2012.
