= National Tube Works (McKeesport, Pennsylvania) =

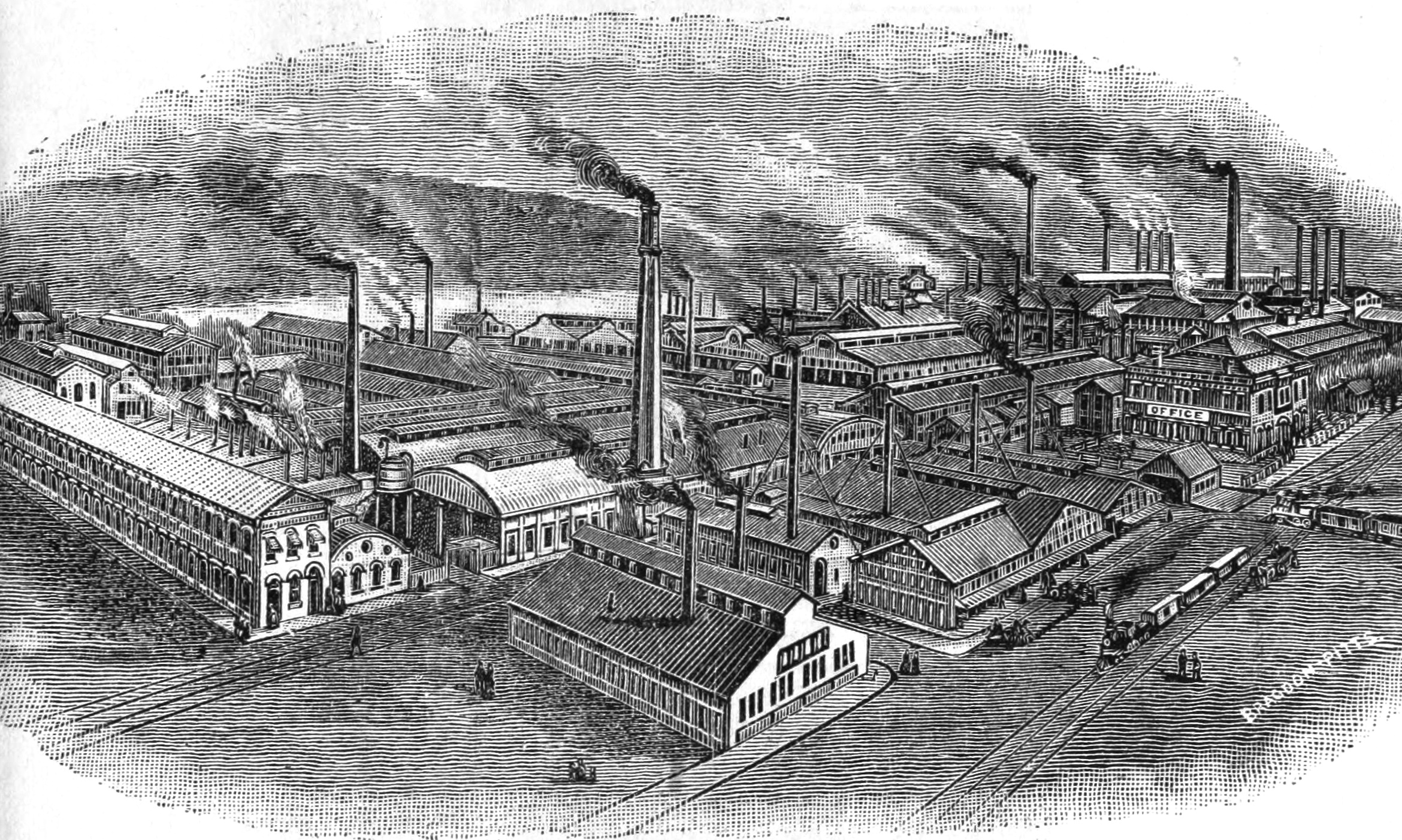
An 1888 illustration of the complex

The National Tube Works, operated by the National Tube Company, was a large steel tube foundry located in McKeesport, Pennsylvania. The tube works employed a large amount of the town and were a symbol of the town itself. Its 1987 closure added toward the downturn that led to the current state of economic depression in the town.

== History ==
The tube works were first constructed in 1869 by John and Harvey Flagler of Boston, Massachusetts. Already having small-scale experience with tube production, they purchased the Fulton, Bolman Company, with their headquarters in McKeesport and constructed a plant in the town. From 1869 to 1901 the plant had major success in its operations. Rolling mills were installed in the 1880s, as well as blast furnaces, and a greater number of lap and butt welding furnaces were also built. The works became highly automated, resulting in a very efficient manufacturing process. Various mergers took place starting in 1891, when the company merged with Republic Iron's South Side Works. This ended in 1901 with it finally being acquired by the United States Steel Corporation. At the time, the McKeesport plant was the world's largest producer of steel pipe.

Steel strikes impacted the plant, with one each occurring in 1909 and 1919. Although tensions between the workers and the company were high, the production of steel pipe was not affected.

During the 1930s the company had major success with the rise of the automobile. The company's inspection procedures set a standard for the production of steel tube. Both seamless and welded manufacturing processes were perfected by the company and impacted other manufacturers in their products. National Tube manufactured over fifty different types of tube during the time.

As Pittsburgh's steel industry declined during the 1970s and 1980s, National Tube was hit hard by the financial issues that affected the American manufacturing industry at the time. Demand was at an all-time low. The final nail in the coffin was a large strike in 1986. Even after the strike ended, the company announced that the McKeesport plant, along several other plants, would be closed for good. National Tube's McKeesport plant was shuttered on August 29, 1987. The company had become a symbol of the town, with the nickname "Tube City" being applied to it.
