= Hays Army Ammunition Plant =

Coordinates: 40.39168°N 79.93236°W

Hays Army Ammunition Plant was an 7.9-acre (3.2 ha), 1,650-employee foundry established in 1942 in the Hays neighborhood of Pittsburgh, Pennsylvania. At first it produced 16-inch (410 mm) shells and 5-inch (130 mm) breechblocks for the Navy. Though owned by the Army, the plant was operated by the Mesta Machine Company on behalf of the United States Navy during World War II. The plant was operated by the Mullins Manufacturing Company during the Korean War and by the Levinson Steel Company during the Vietnam War. For the Army it produced 105 mm shells, 250,000 of these per month throughout 1968. It was the only Army plant with cold extrusion capability. Manufacturing ceased in May 1970 and the plant was mothballed in June 1971. The 1982 value of the complex was $69 million. The plant was placed on standby in 1991 and donated for redevelopment in 1993. In 1995, it was converted into a hot-dip steel galvanizing facility called GalvTech. In 2007, the facility was purchased by Steel Dynamics.

== Headstamp ==
The headstamp and manufacturer code for Hays Army Ammunition Plant is HYAAP.
