= Songwhale =

Interactive technology company

Songwhale is an interactive technology company based in Pittsburgh, Pennsylvania with offices in Minneapolis, Minnesota and Milwaukee, Wisconsin. Founded in 2007 by Ty Morse and Jon Greenlee, Songwhale develops mobile media technologies through internet and SMS technology for all devices, and designs mobile marketing campaigns for businesses.

== History ==
Songwhale was conceived as a platform for sharing music through mobile media and mobile technologies. The company then evolved that technology into a mechanism for delivering content digitally to handheld and other devices, providing behind-the-scenes access and promotions at sporting events and other live performances. Through its partnership with California University of Pennsylvania, Songwhale expanded the applications of its technologies from athletics into education, creating tools to support the college experience from the practical, like emergency alerts and campus maps, to the desirable, like food delivery.

The development of new mobile technologies and the repurposing of those they had created enabled Songwhale to move into overseas markets in Thailand, China, Japan, and Indonesia. Additionally, Songwhale partnered with Cannella Response Television to adapt their mobile technology platforms to the direct response market.

== Products ==
Songwhale creates marketing campaigns using mobile technologies. In 2011, Songwhale developed a text-to-purchase payment system, Paywhale. Paywhale allows direct response television to send text messages to consumers, in addition to their traditional consumer interface, 1-800 numbers. Through the Paywhale model, direct response is adapting to its consumers affinity for their handheld devices and can use the database their clients become part of for re-marketing.

In 2015, Songwhale launched Cheapest Texting as a low-cost SMS platform.

== Awards ==
♦Ernst & Young Entrepreneur of the Year Award Finalist, 2009, Ty Morse, Songwhale

♦Ernst & Young Entrepreneur of the Year Award Finalist, 2010, Ty Morse, Songwhale

♦Pittsburgh Technology Council's Tech 50 Startup of the Year Nominee, 2011

♦Pittsburgh Technology Council's Tech 50 Nominee for New Media, 2012
