= General Electric Everett Plant =

- Built: 1941
- Location: Everett, Massachusetts
- Coordinates: 42°24′36.67″N 71°4′9.44″W
- Products: General Electric CF6; General Electric CFM56; General Electric T700; General Electric F404; General Electric F101

General Electric Everett Plant, formerly known as Air Force Plant 28, was a plant operated by General Electric from 1941 into the 1980s in Everett, Massachusetts. It was situated along the Malden River on a 43-acre tract, covering 344,342 square feet. The facility, before it was demolished, was the location of ten smaller buildings and one large manufacturing facility. At the time, it was also home to machining, metal stamping, welding, grinding, cleaning and parts testing. Previously, the plant also was home to metal plating. The plant was closed after General Electric decided to consolidate manufacturing at other plants across the country, including to that in nearby Lynn, where parts from Everett were assembled into engines.
