= Mesta Machinery =

Industrial machinery manufacturer

- Type: Public company
- Industry: Manufacturing
- Predecessors: Robinson-Rea Mfg. Company; Leechburg Foundry & Machine Company
- Founded: 1898; 128 years ago in West Homestead, Pennsylvania
- Founder: George Mesta
- Defunct: February 1983
- Fate: Bankrupted
- Headquarters: West Homestead, Pennsylvania
- Products: industrial machinery

Mesta Machine was a leading industrial machinery manufacturer based in the Pittsburgh area town of West Homestead, Pennsylvania. It was founded in 1898 by George Mesta when he merged his machine shop with another. Mesta "machines" can be found in factories throughout the world and as of 1984 had equipment in 500 steel mills. Mesta was the 488th largest American company in 1958 and the 414th largest in 1959.

== President Mesta ==
By 1919 Mesta employed 3,000 at West Homestead and manufactured everything from ship propeller shafts to giant turbines for power plants and dams. In 1917, George's wife Perle Mesta wrote that the works "was a thrilling site, spread over many acres on the banks of the Monongahela." George Mesta died in 1925.

== President Wahr ==
Harry F. Wahr was the handpicked successor to Mesta and his nephew. Wahr committed suicide in 1930.

== President Iversen ==
Lorenz Iversen took over the company in 1930, leading it until December 31, 1963. One of the first things Iversen accomplished in the early 1930s was to buy Perle Mesta's controlling preferred stock, effectively buying the company from her. Iversen was a native of Denmark and immigrated to the US. He worked in a factory in New Jersey before returning to Denmark to get his degree in engineering, then worked at Mesta as a draftsman in 1903. Prior to 1930 he became chief engineer and held patents on devices integral to every machine manufactured by Mesta, allowing him to establish $4 million trusts ($94 million today) for each of his five children by 1932. Mesta won the contract to build the Mon Valley Works–Irvin Plant for U.S. Steel in 1934.

=== Management style ===
Iversen was described by many former employees as the glue that held Mesta together. In the 1930s he won a large contract with a steel manufacturer by foregoing the company's standard fee in exchange for a share of the profits of the manufactured mill. He would regularly cheer on his workers and had a ritual of standing on a hastily made stage every time Mesta won a new contract and exclaiming: "We got this job because you’re the best mechanics in the world!" He often had face-to-face talks with employees and would work the factory floor on weekends, holidays and Christmas, asking workers about new babies or ailing family members. Mesta workers repeatedly voted down efforts to unionize the factory despite its proximity to unionized steel mills including the (infamous in labor history) Homestead Mill. Iversen credited his employment policy based on human relations as the chief reason his workers rejected unionization. A month after his death in 1967 (and four years after he stepped down as president) Mesta was unionized.

=== World War II ===
Mesta's West Homestead plant was a center for WWII production. It earned the Army-Navy E Award, and was one of seven factories to earn six stars. Mesta specialized in manufacturing 16-inch naval guns, ship-propeller shafts, artillery carriages and "Long Toms" 155-mm cannons. Iversen personally oversaw the production of "Little David", a 36-inch bore mortar that was put into production for the canceled Japanese invasion. During the war, Iversen transformed Mesta into one of the nation's top ordnance suppliers, personally working 18-hour shifts in the factory. His accounting department also ran two 8-hour shifts per day.

Mesta, and later Iverson, operated the Hays Army Ammunition Plant from the 1940s through the 1960s.

Mesta Machine also operated a manufacturing facility in New Castle, Pa. that was shuttered when the company filed for bankruptcy in 1983.

=== Post war success ===
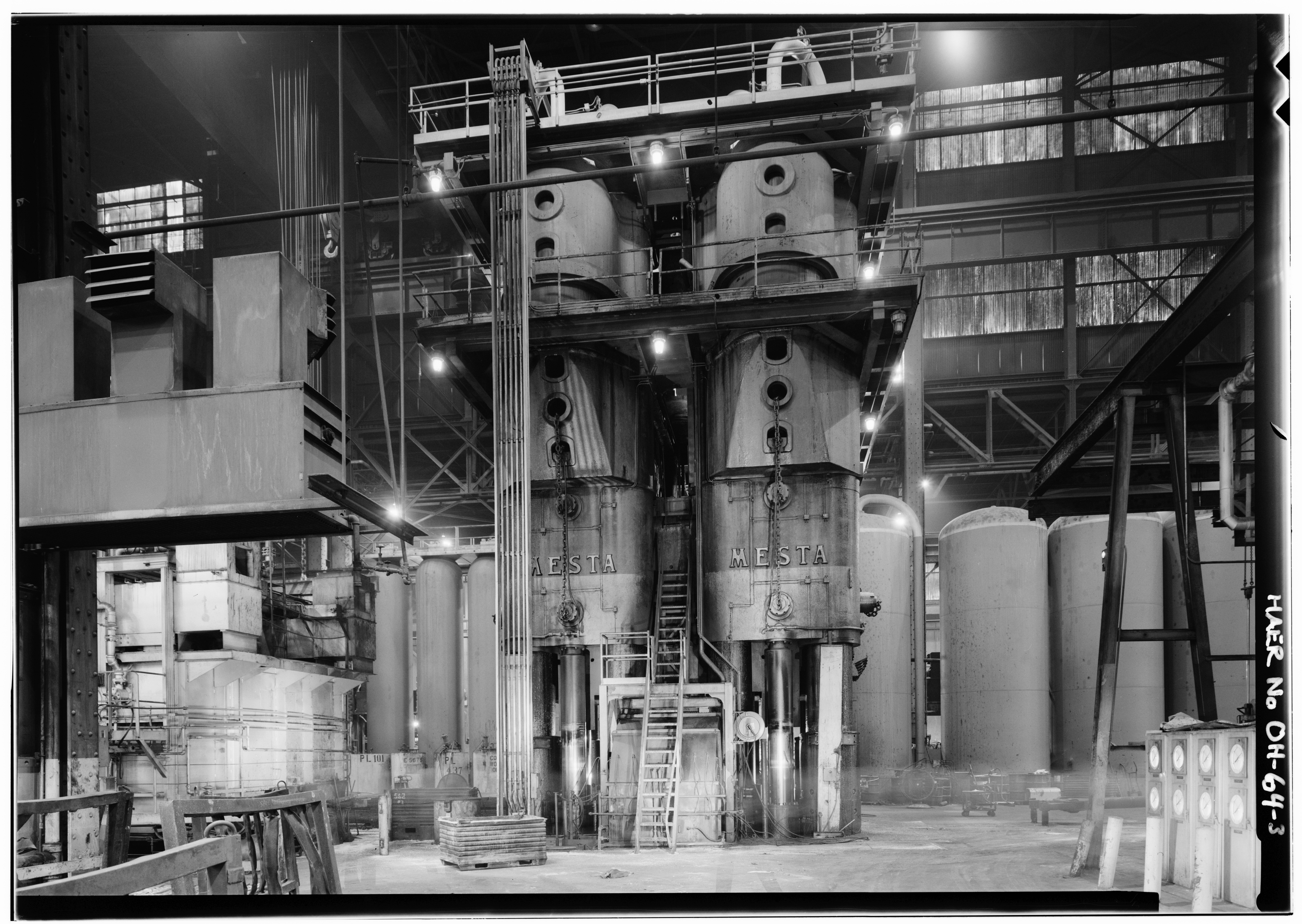
A fifty thousand ton Mesta press manufactured for Alcoa in 1952.

The company manufactured a 50,000 ton press (the "fifty") as part of the Heavy Press Program, initially owned by the Air Force in 1952 and operated by Alcoa, which purchased it outright in 1982. The press manufactures structural components for aircraft such as the 747 and DC-10 jetliners. After being taken out of service due to cracking in the structure, it was refurbished over three years at a cost of $100 million, and returned to service in 2012.

Mesta manufactured equipment and parts that were of size and complexity that few others could match. They had a complete foundry on site and poured and machined the large steel and iron castings used in their machinery. Their main product was rolling mills for steel manufacturers, but they also produced one of a kind items such as gears that were so large that they had to be produced in halves because there was no vehicle large enough to haul the entire gear. The halves would be shipped by rail in most cases. Heavy lifting devices were another product line.

=== Khrushchev visit ===
In September 1959, Nikita Khrushchev visited the Mesta Machine Co. factory on his tour of the U.S., where he encountered a Mesta employee who was from the same part of Ukraine as he was. They had a brief conversation, and Kruschev was so happy to meet a fellow Ukranian that he took off his wristwatch and gave it to him as a gift. To commemorate the occasion, Mesta employees painted a red Russian star on the door of the company delivery truck that the employee drove. The truck was still in use when the company folded, still with the star on the doors.

== Demise ==
Mesta filed for bankruptcy in February 1983, and most of its West Homestead works was sold off in June 1983. The company's last assets were sold in April 1988. The property in West Homestead where Mesta Machine was located was mostly occupied by Whemco Steel Castings. Whemco manufactured heavy industrial equipment and mill rolls, much like the products of the former Mesta Machine. Whemco ceased operations at the plant in 2024 and it currently sits abandoned.

A spin-off company called Mestek briefly had some success. After reorganization the remaining units were the former in house engineering and computer services departments. The company was publicly listed and had tax benefits from loss carry forwards. Mestek was used as a corporate vehicle by Reed National.

The cause of Mesta's closure has been attributed mostly to their failure to adapt to the continuous caster technology that most steel manufacturers were adopting from the late 1970s onward. A secondary cause was labor unrest.There had been a long strike in the mid-1970s that left a residue of animosity between management and the workforce.

A large portion of Sandcastle Water Park sits on land that had been where Mesta's foundry was located.
