= Mary Ellen Welch Greenway =

Shared use path and park in East Boston

Coordinates: 42.3756°N 71.0300°W

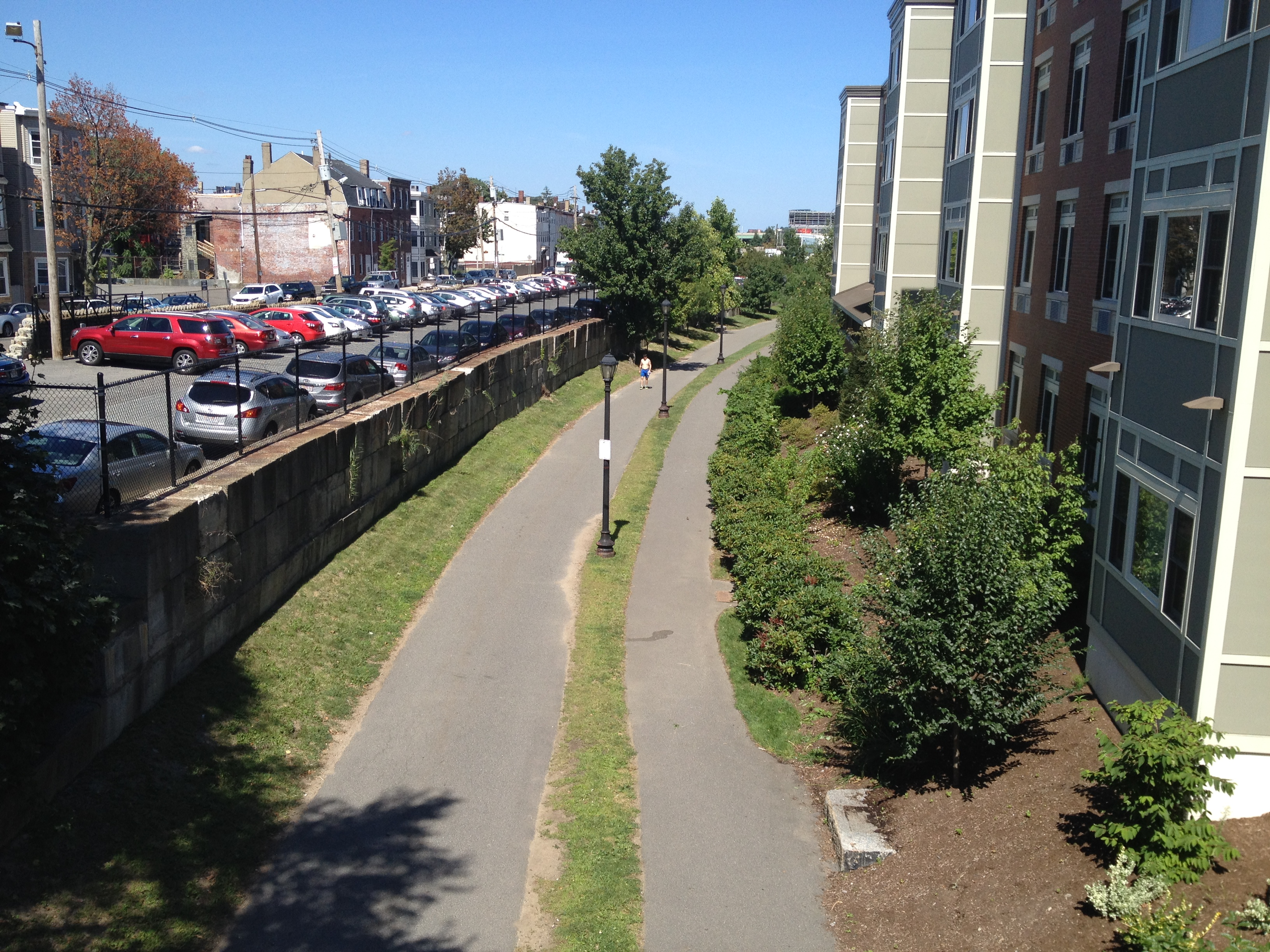
- Section of the shared use path on the Greenway
- Interactive map of Mary Ellen Welch Greenway
- Type: Urban park
- Location: East Boston, Boston, Massachusetts
- Area: 15 acres (61,000 m^{2})/1.5 miles (2.4 km)
- Operator: Massachusetts Port Authority
- Status: Open all year
- Public transit: Maverick Station, Airport Station and Wood Island Station via the MBTA Blue Line

The Mary Ellen Welch Greenway (formerly the East Boston Greenway) is a rail trail and park in East Boston that is located along the path of a former Conrail line. The greenway connects several significant open space areas in East Boston, including Piers Park, Memorial Stadium, Bremen Street Park, Wood Island Bay Marsh and Belle Isle Marsh. When completed, the line is expected to be 3.3 miles in length.

== History ==
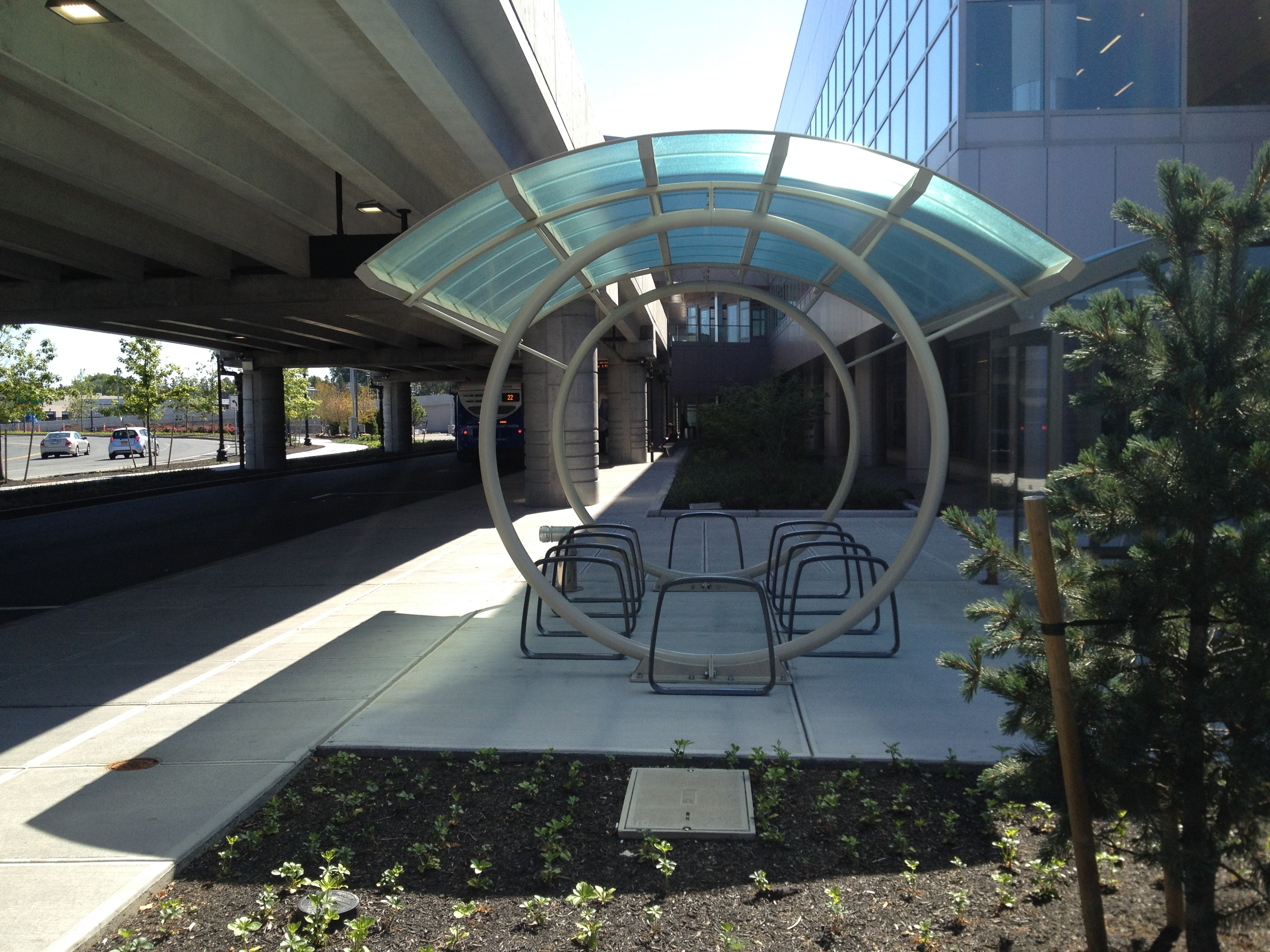
Bicycle parking at Logan Rental Car Center, accessible from the Greenway

Originally, the line in East Boston was built for industrial usage by the Grand Junction Railroad and Depot Company. At points, the Greenway parallels the tracks of the former Boston, Revere Beach and Lynn Railroad, now the MBTA's Blue Line. After Conrail abandoned the tracks, the area became a dumping ground, and the area was first cleaned up by residents in 1978. Supported by the Lila Wallace-Reader's Digest Fund, the Boston Natural Areas Fund and local advocates, The Trust for Public Land started the process to acquire the abandoned rail corridor to transform into a greenway and bike trail. In 1997, The Trust for Public Land received 1.2 miles of the corridor as a donation from Conrail. Mitigation funds from the Massachusetts Highway Department and EPA paid for the clean-up costs. A year later, the first half-mile segment was transferred from The Trust for Public Land to the city.

The entire community was not necessarily supportive of the idea at first, as the local chamber of commerce wanted to use the route as a truck route to Logan International Airport. This idea gained little support, and construction of the East Boston Greenway began in 1999. In 2007, the Greenway opened.

== Points of interest ==
The Greenway passes through Bremen Street Park, where there is an entrance to the Blue Line Airport Station. Free shuttle buses connect the station to the airport terminals. A branch off of the Greenway leads to the East Boston Memorial Stadium and to the Logan Airport Rental Car Center, where there is also bicycle parking. Off of Bremen Street, the East Boston YMCA is located at the former engine house for the line, and was constructed in 1909.

== See also ==
- Emerald Necklace, a similar greenway also in Boston
- Bremen Street Park, a park along the East Boston Greenway
- Piers Park, the park at the harborside Greenway terminus.
