= Bremen Street Park =

Urban park in East Boston, Massachusetts, USA

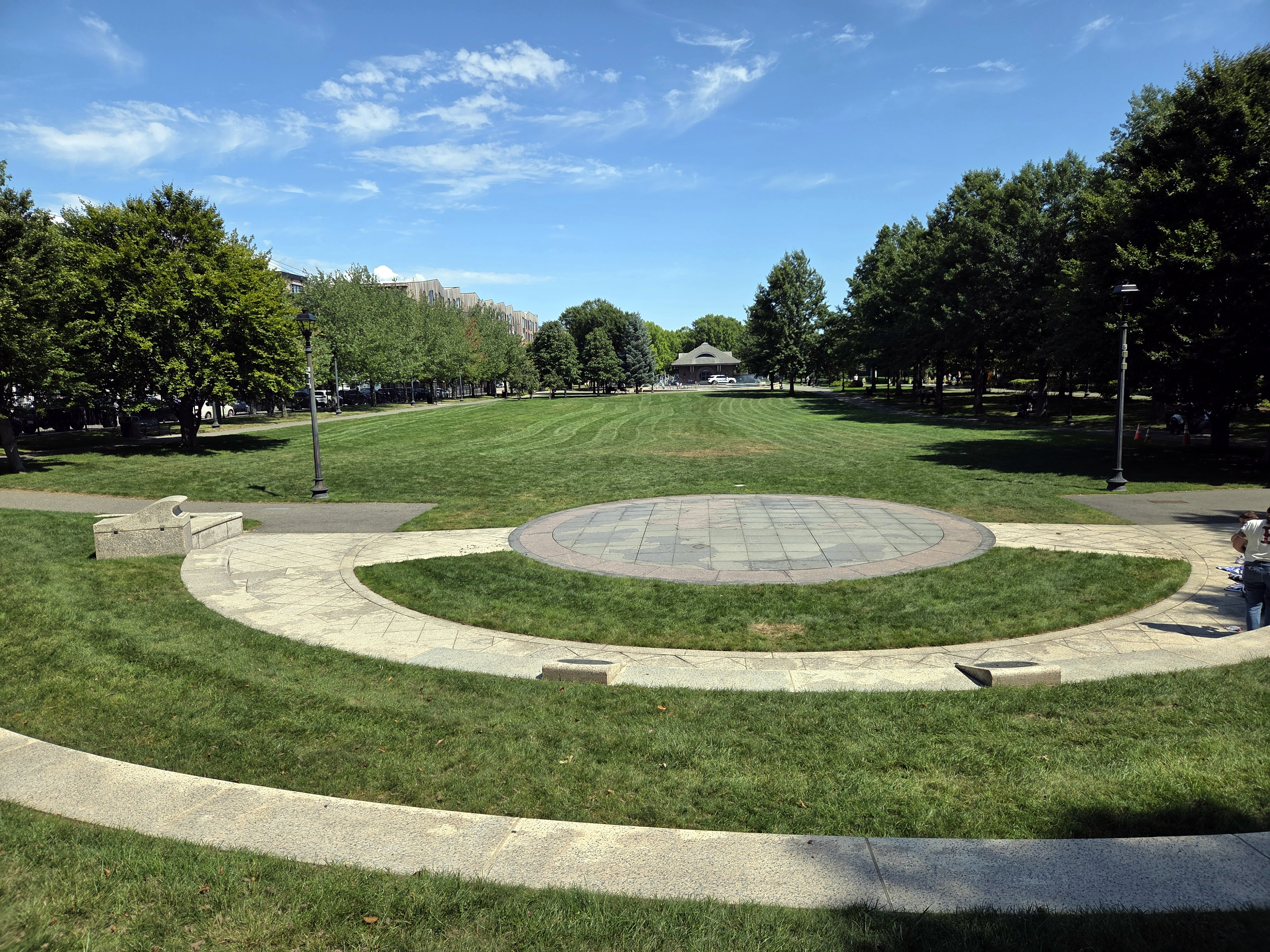
- Amphitheater in Bremen Street Park in 2026
- Interactive map of Bremen Street Park
- Type: Urban park
- Location: East Boston, Boston, Massachusetts
- Coordinates: 42.3754°N 71.0306°W
- Area: 18 acres (0.073 km^{2})
- Created: 2007
- Operator: MassPort
- Status: Open all year
- Public transit: Airport Station on the MBTA Blue Line

Bremen Street Park is an 18-acre urban park, located in East Boston, Boston, Massachusetts. The park runs parallel to both Bremen Street and the Mass Pike/Route 1A and acts as a green space buffer between Logan International Airport and the residential neighborhoods of East Boston. The park is owned, operated and patrolled by the Massachusetts Port Authority (MassPort). It is also part of the East Boston Greenway, a linear park and shared use path.

Bremen Street Park is open year-round to the public, and includes amenities such as a large public lawns, a shared use path, a spray fountain, a community garden, playgrounds, a performance amphitheater and East Boston's only dog park.

== Description ==
=== Structures ===
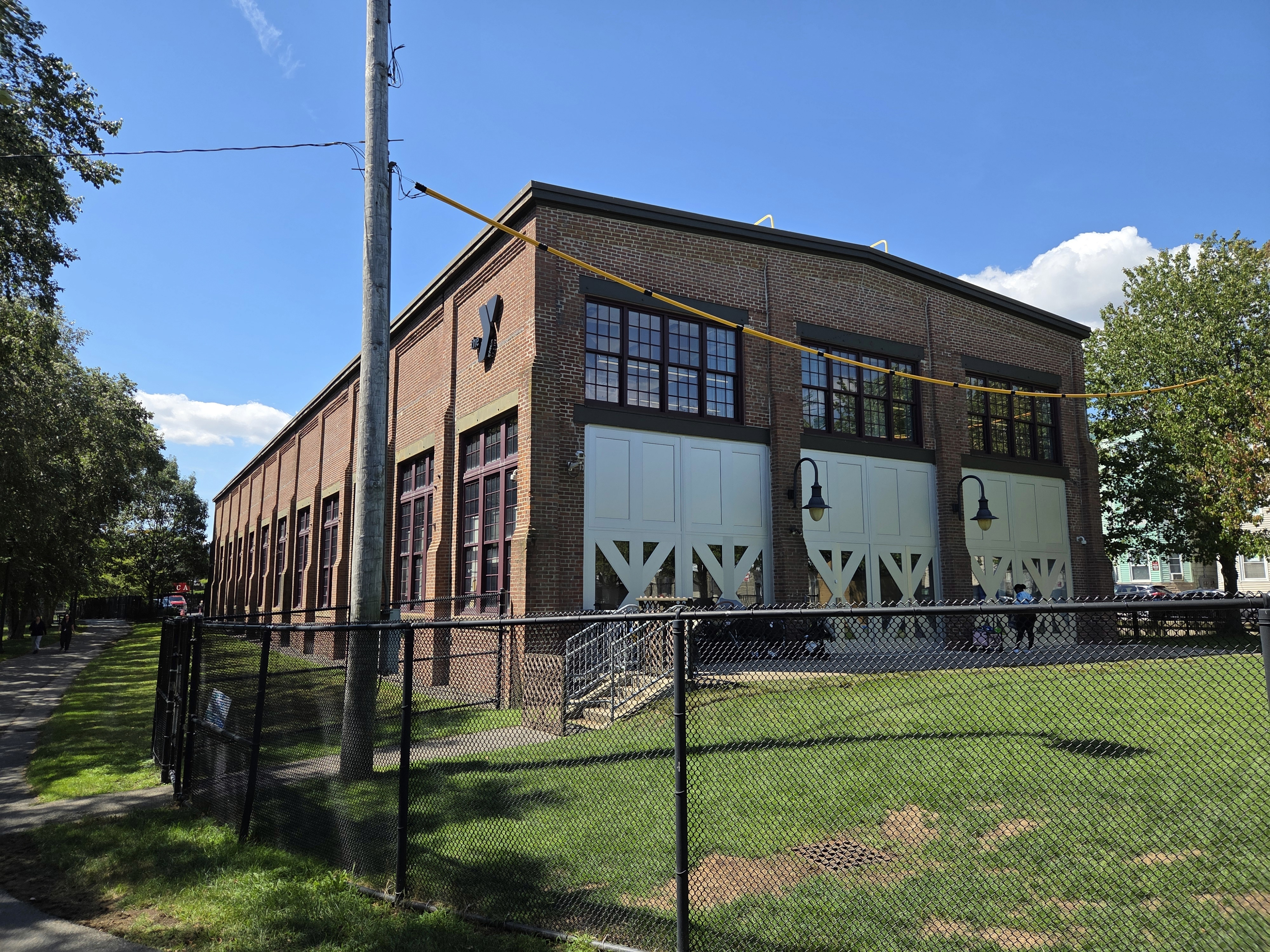
East Boston YMCA in 2026

At the northern terminus of the park lies the East Boston Branch of the Boston Public Library. The library is located at 365 Bremen Street and was opened in November 2013. The glass façade was designed to provide an open view of Bremen Street Park and in January 2014, MassPort donated $25,000 to support a year's worth of programs at the library.

At the south-west terminus of the park lies the East Boston YMCA, located at 215 Bremen Street. Originally built in 1909, the building was formerly the engine house where engines for locomotives were repaired. After the decline in rail use for goods transport in the 1960s, the engine house was closed and the building was used as a manufacturing facility for the Standard Box Spring Company. The building was later vacated and abandoned by the 1990s and reopened as the YMCA.

Near the Brooks Street entrance is a 1,300-square-foot (120 m^{2}) pavilion building which also houses rest room facilities, fountain and irrigation equipment, and park security offices.

=== Recreation facilities ===
Map of Bremen Street Park

Directly across from Airport Station, at the Brooks Street entrance to the park, lies a large spray fountain open to the public during the summer months. There are three playgrounds located within the park: one at the south-west terminus, next to the YMCA, and two in the center next to the spray fountain pavilion. The playgrounds are open to the public during daylight hours in the spring, summer and autumn months.

Along the north-east edge of the park, across from the Boston Public Library, lies a community garden, which offers residents a place to grow their own flowers, vegetables, and plants. When originally opened in July 2007, there were 46 plots available. In October 2010, MassPort expanded the garden, adding 27 additional plots.

In the middle of the park lies an outdoor performance amphitheater; a tiered grassy area for events and performances. At the center of the amphitheater lies a cement platform with a map of East Boston and the original islands that made up the area. In the middle of the park lies a monument of Donald McKay, an East Boston Resident best known as the builder of clipper ships, including the Flying Cloud. Park designers Brown, Richardson & Rowe worked with a local artist to incorporate this sculpture into the park design.

In October 2014, MassPort announced the plans for East Boston's first dog park, giving residents a place to bring their dogs. Dedicated on September 14, 2015, the Bremen Street Dog Park is located at the southeast terminus of Bremen Street Park, underneath the Route 1A overpass near the Sumner Tunnel, where the neighborhoods of Jeffries Point and lower Eagle Hill intersect. The $250,000 half-acre dog park is divided into a 17,000-square-foot section for larger dogs and a 5,500-square-foot part for smaller ones, fenced off from each other. Each area has its own dog exercise centers including agility courses, pet waste stations, benches, separate water fountains for dogs and their owners, and benches. Pressley Associates Landscape Architects of Boston designed the park's dog play area with a surface of crushed gravel, replacing the site's original cobblestones. An asphalt track for dog owners to socialize, run around, or watch their dogs at play surrounds the graveled area. The remainder of Bremen Street Park does not allow dogs.

== History ==
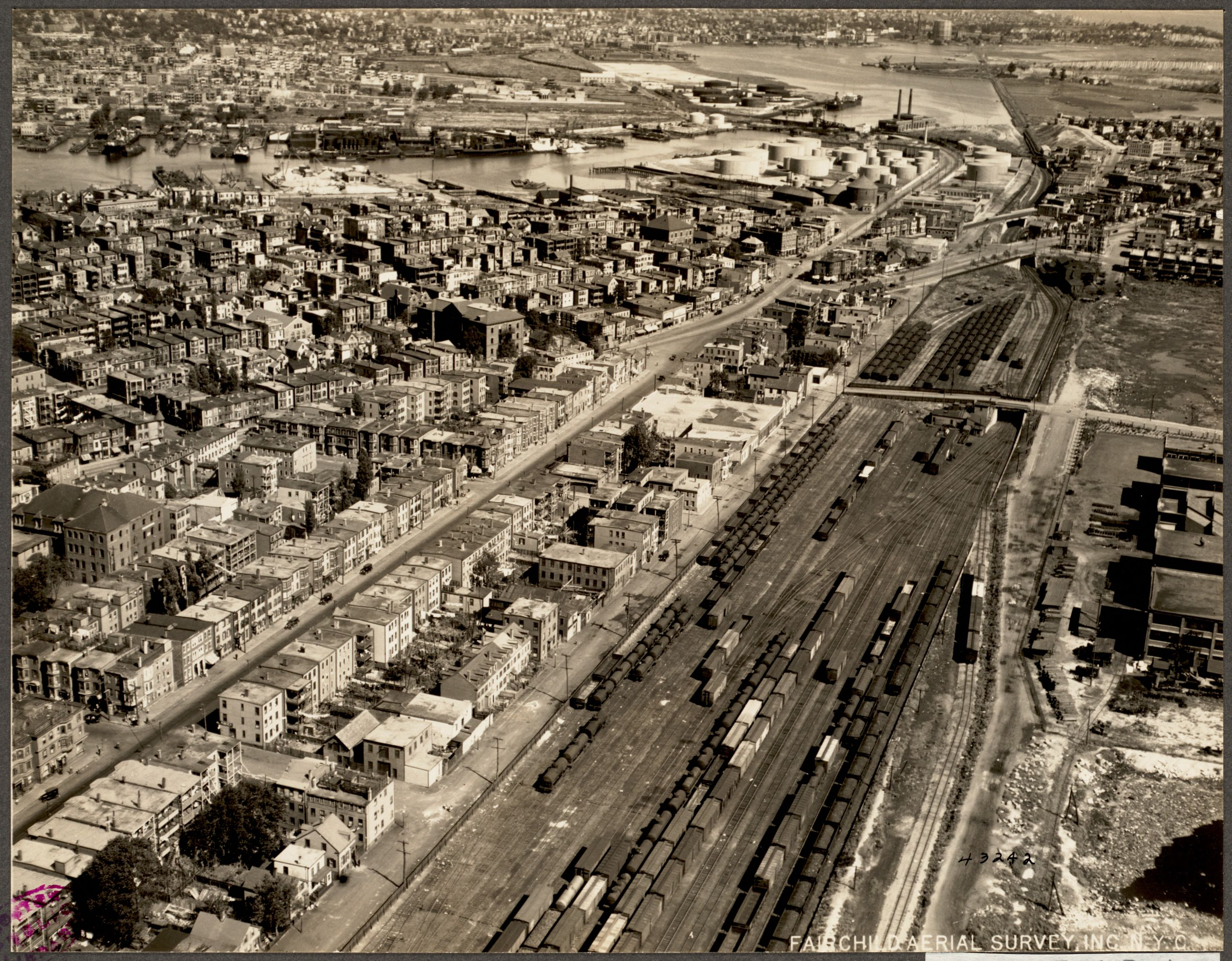
The rail yards in 1925

Conrail abandoned the section of the former Grand Junction Railroad between Lovell Street and the East Boston docks in the 1970s. The former rail yards north of Route 1A were used as a private "Park'N'Fly" lot for Logan Airport. In 1989, the Massachusetts Highway Department began proceedings to acquire the land by eminent domain as part of the Big Dig project. Since the Third Harbor Tunnel would bring additional traffic to Logan Airport, the site was to be converted to a public park, in partial restitution for the 1969 destruction of Wood Island Park for airport expansion. After a lengthy scandal over the proposed land taking (and later land swap) that sent Speaker of the Massachusetts House of Representatives Charles Flaherty to jail and implicated others including U.S. Representative Bud Shuster, Massport purchased the land outright in 2001. The park was designed by Brown, Richardson & Rowe and opened in 2007, when MassPort took over operations, maintenance and security from the Central Artery/Tunnel project.
