= Airport station (MBTA) =

Rapid transit station in Boston, Massachusetts, US

Airport
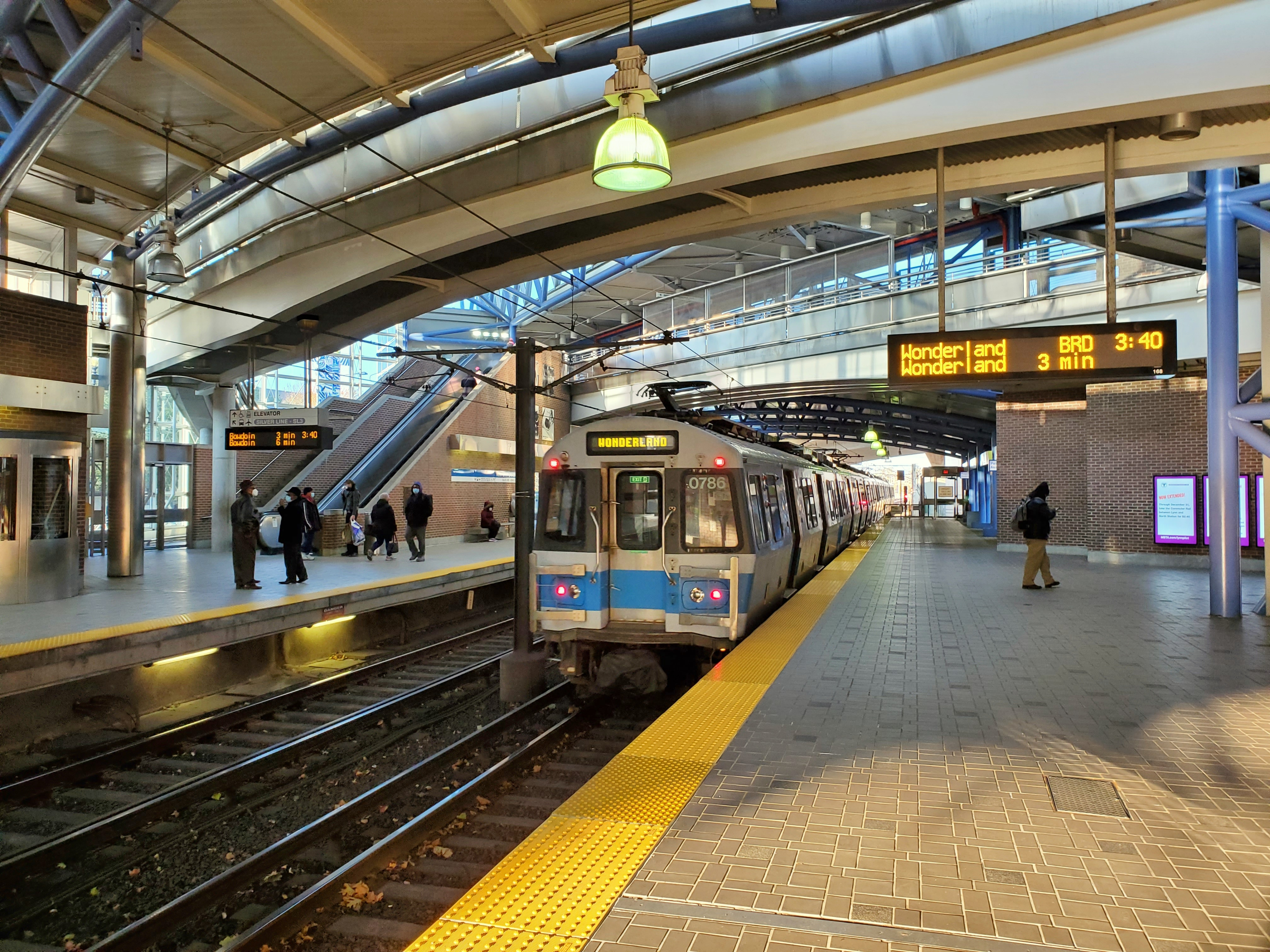
- An outbound Blue Line train leaving Airport station in 2020

General information
- Location: Transportation Way at Service Road; East Boston, Massachusetts
- Coordinates: 42.374374°N 71.030243°W
- Line: Revere Extension
- Platforms: 2 side platforms (Blue Line); 1 side platform (Silver Line)
- Connections: Massport shuttle: 22, 33, 55, 66, 88; MBTA bus: 104, 171

Construction
- Cycle facilities: Racks
- Accessible: Yes

History
- Opened: January 5, 1952
- Rebuilt: April 2000–June 3, 2004

Passengers
- FY2019: 7,404 (Blue Line average boardings)

Services
Preceding station	MBTA	Following station
Maverick toward Bowdoin	Blue Line	Wood Island toward Wonderland
Silver Line Way toward South Station	Silver Line SL3	Eastern Avenue toward Chelsea
Location

Airport station is a rapid transit station in Boston, Massachusetts. It serves the MBTA Blue Line and the SL3 branch of the Silver Line. It is located in East Boston under the interchange between Interstate 90 and Massachusetts Route 1A. The station provides one of two mass transit connections to the nearby Logan International Airport, as well as serving local residents in East Boston. Shuttle buses connect the station with the airport terminals and other facilities.

At Airport, Blue Line trains switch between the third rail power used in the East Boston Tunnel to overhead wires used on the surface line to Revere. The original brick station built in 1952 was replaced by a modern station with steel and glass canopies in 2004.

== Station layout ==
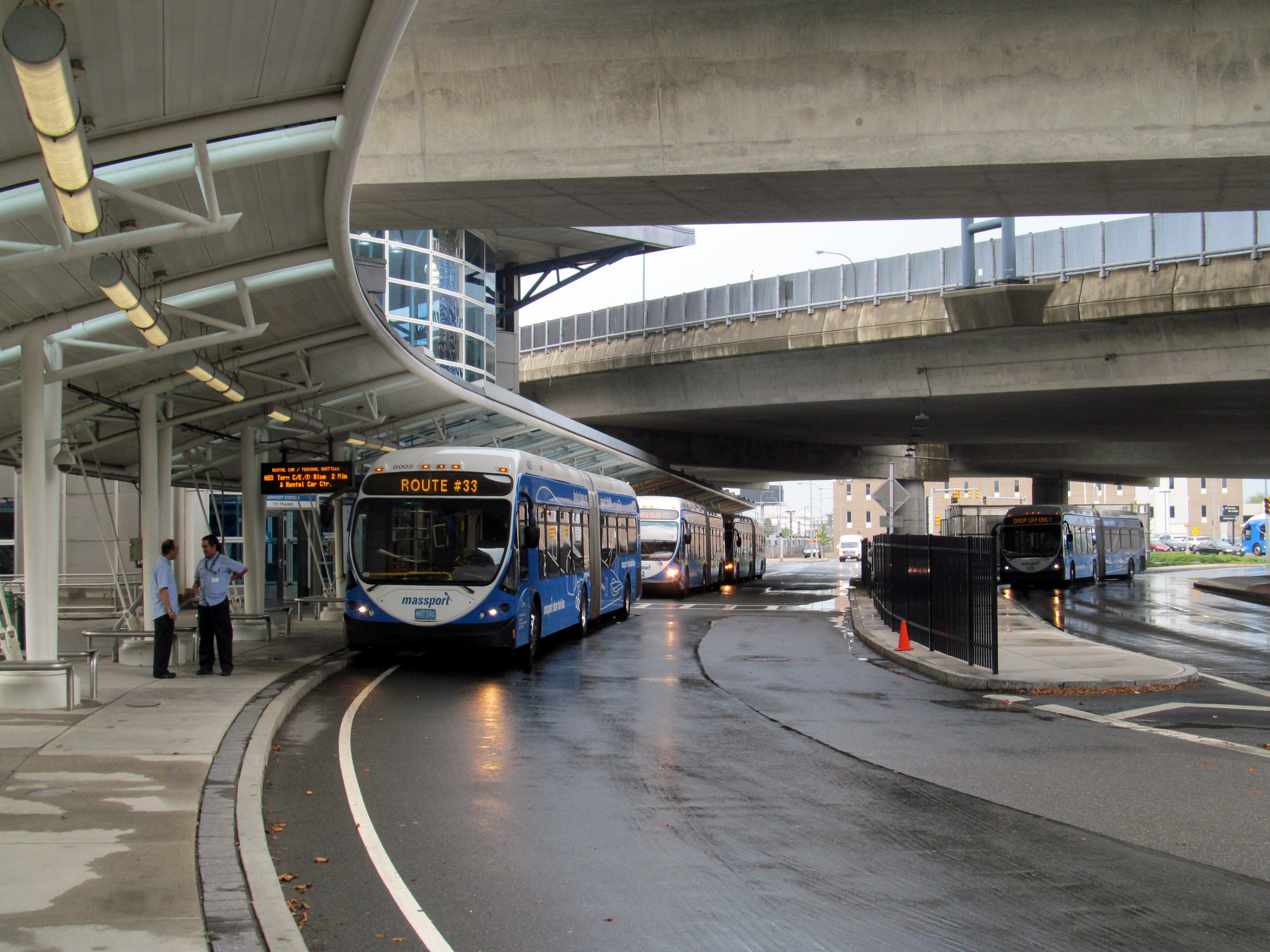
Massport Shuttle buses at the station

Airport station is located in East Boston at the western edge of Logan International Airport within the interchange of Interstate 90 and Massachusetts Route 1A. It has two side platforms serving the two tracks of the Blue Line, which runs approximately northeast–southwest at street level through the station. A trainshed covers the tracks; it is intersected by a taller, north–south volume that contains the fare lobby and two footbridges (one outside the paid area) over the tracks.

The west entrance to the station serves residential portions of East Boston via Bremen Street Park, with a footbridge over the northbound lanes of Route 1A. The east entrance primarily serves a busway off Transportation Way; a footpath also connects to residential areas to the south, East Boston Memorial Park, and the East Boston Greenway.

Massport operates the Massport Shuttle, a free bus service between Airport station, the four airport terminals, the rental car center (RCC), offices and cargo terminals on the south side of the airport, and the MBTA ferry/water taxi terminal. Airport station is served by routes 22, 33, 55, 66, and 88. The busway is also used by MBTA Silver Line route SL3 and MBTA bus routes 104 and 171.

== History ==
=== Original station ===
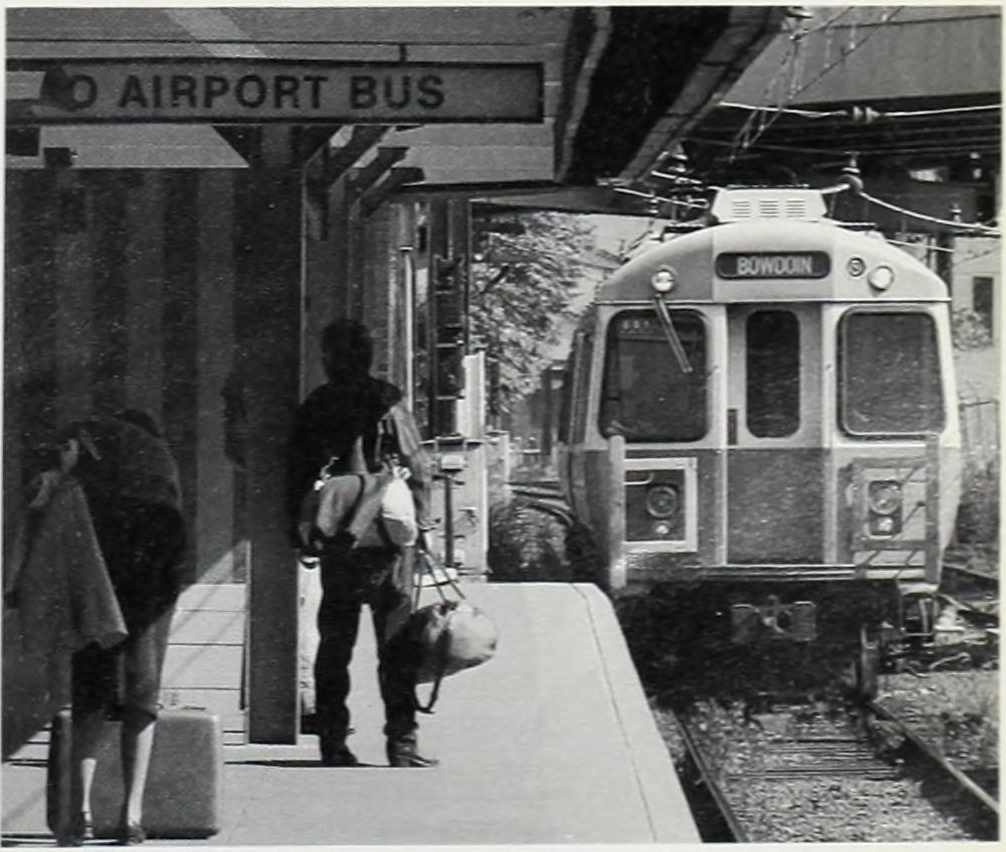
A Boston-bound train arriving at the 1952-built Airport station in 1985

The Metropolitan Transit Authority (MTA) opened the first phase of the Revere Extension on January 5, 1952, with new stations at Airport, Wood Island, and Orient Heights. This phase connected the East Boston Tunnel at Maverick to the Boston, Revere Beach and Lynn narrow gauge right of way between Wood Island and Orient Heights. For a short distance that includes Airport station, this connecting line follows a right of way, now the East Boston Greenway, that was once used by the Grand Junction Railroad and the Eastern Railroad. Airport was the first American urban transit connection to a commercial airport. The station was modernized in 1967–68 as part of a $9 million systemwide station improvement program.

=== Reconstruction ===
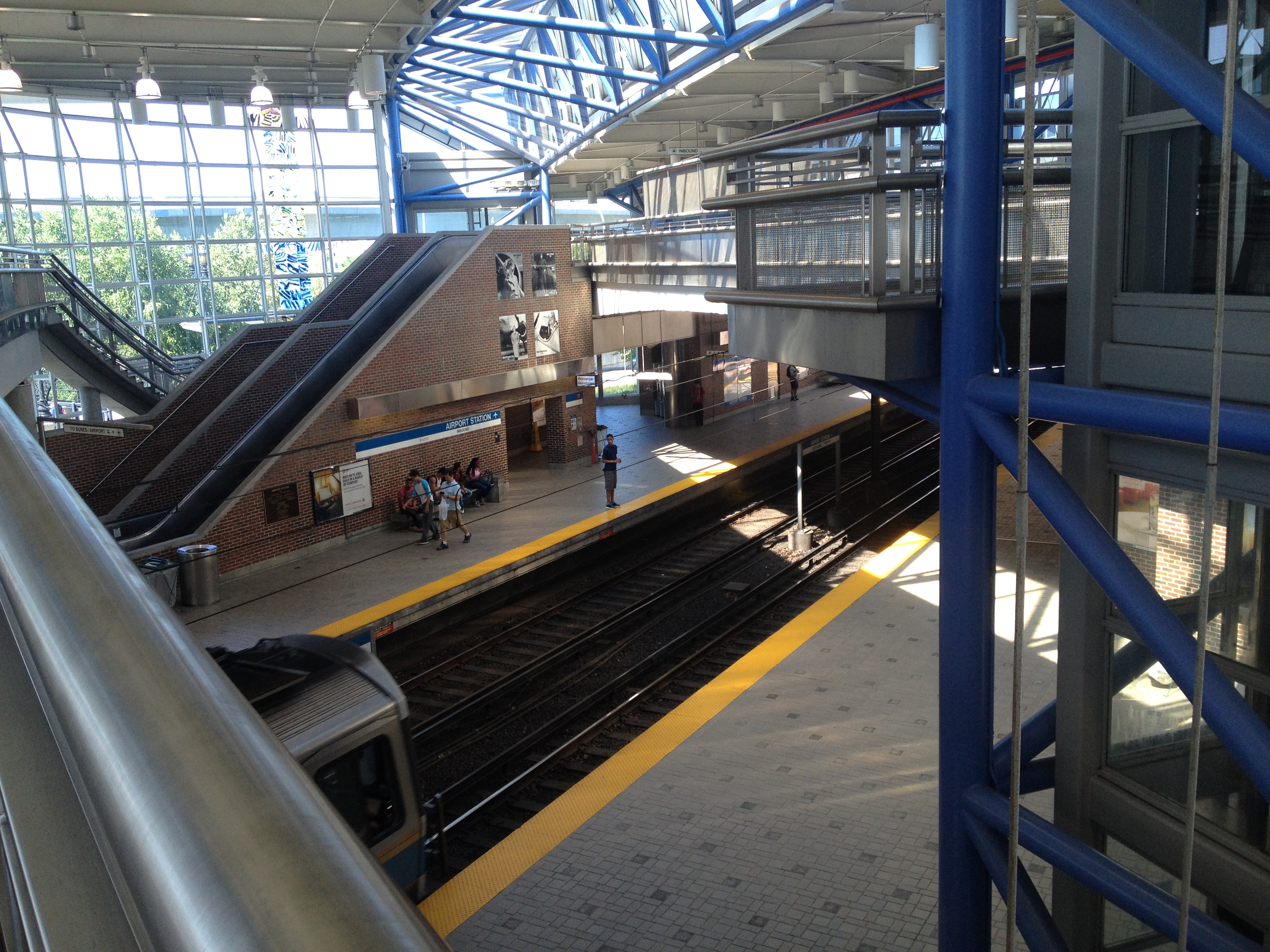
The 2004-built Airport station in 2014

Construction of ramps for the Big Dig project required relocation of the Blue Line between Airport station and Wood Island station around 1999–2000. Overhead catenary was re-installed between Maverick and Airport stations as part of the work. On November 5, 1999, Maverick replaced Airport as the new transition point between third rail and catenary power.

In April 2000, the Massachusetts Bay Transportation Authority began construction on a $23 million project to replace the 1952-built station. The new station, located approximately 500 feet east of the old station due to Big Dig relocation of highway ramps, opened June 3, 2004. It is fully accessible, with the platforms connected by a pedestrian bridge with elevators, and has longer platforms than the previous station in order to accommodate 6-car trains (which began operation in 2008). The station includes several features to serve airport travelers, including luggage slides adjacent to the faregates, wider escalators and elevators, and monitors showing flight statuses.

In 2001, the MBTA began a $2.3 million federally-funded program to install ten new artworks and restore existing pieces. The centerpiece of the program was Totems of Light, a pair of 40-by-6-foot (12.2 m × 1.8 m) stained glass windows at the rebuilt Airport station. Designed by Linda Lichtman, the work cost $90,000.

=== Silver Line ===
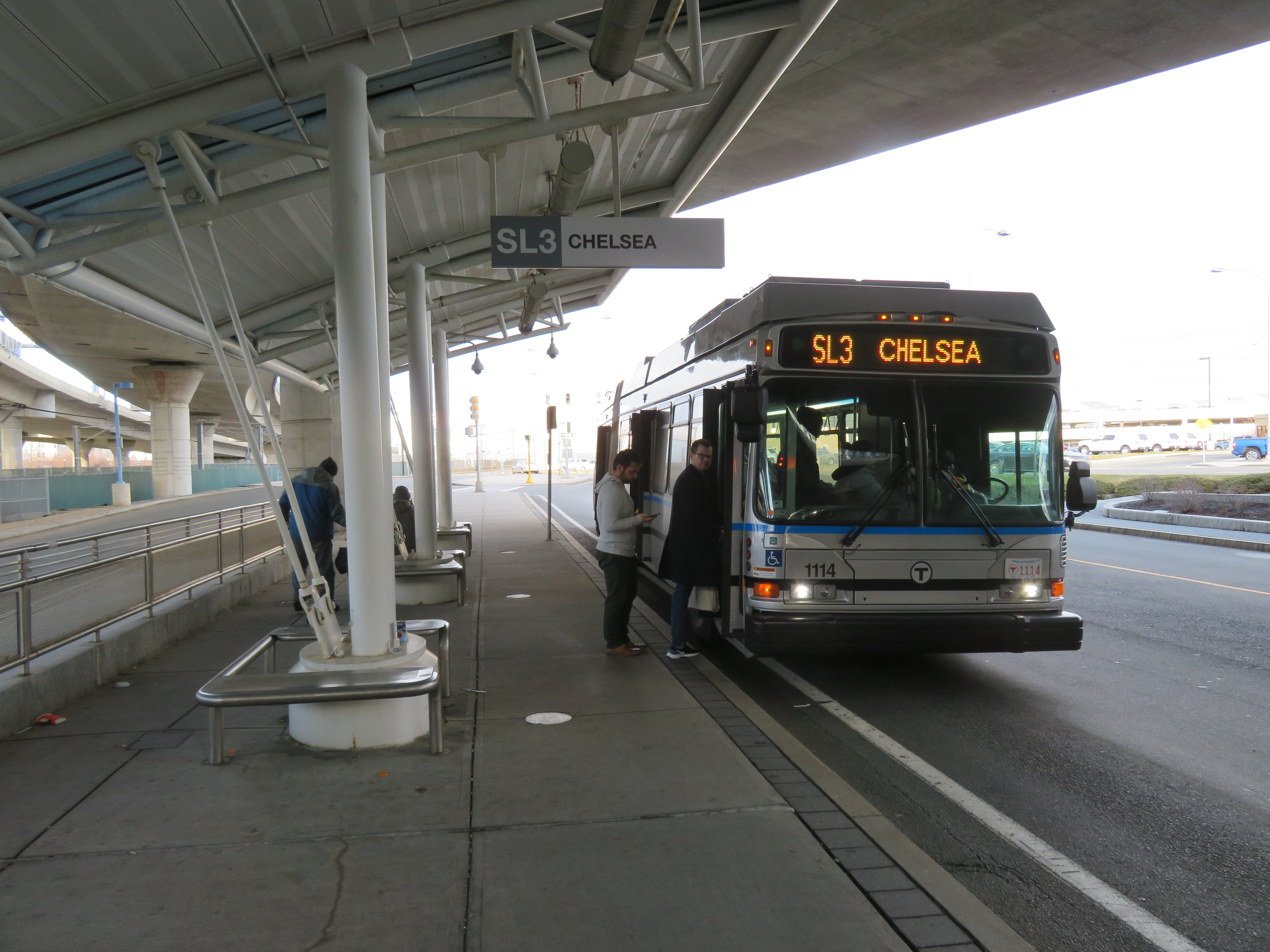
An SL3 bus at the station in 2018

Until 2005, the station was the primary rapid transit link between Boston to the airport. As part of Big Dig environmental mitigation, the state was mandated to run Silver Line service to the airport terminals. Full-time service from South Station began on June 1, 2005. This SL1 service has replaced the transfer at Airport station for many travelers, although the station still sees substantial airport traffic.

Airport station was a proposed stop on the Urban Ring Project. The Urban Ring was to be a circumferential bus rapid transit (BRT) line designed to connect the current radial MBTA rail lines, to reduce overcrowding in the downtown stations, but it was canceled in 2010. Under draft plans released in 2008, a new surface-level BRT platform was to be built on the north side of the existing busway. Although the full project was shelved due to the MBTA's financial difficulties, some corridor routes received more limited work, including a branch of the Silver Line to Chelsea. The new branch separates from the SL1 route before Logan Airport; it stops at Airport station at the previously proposed spot, then runs over a haul road and a new busway constructed on a former section of the Grand Junction Railroad. The SL3 service began on April 21, 2018.

=== Plans ===
In October 2015, Massport released plans for a major expansion of Terminal E which would include a pedestrian bridge directly to the station. With half a mile between the terminal and the station, the moving walkways for the connection would be among the longest in the world. In April 2018, Massport announced a $15 million study of a possible automated people mover system to connect the Airport Station with the four terminals, rental car center, and economy parking. It would replace the shuttle busses and serve instead of the proposed walkway. Implementation was estimated to cost $1 billion and take ten years.
