= Maverick station =

Subway station in Boston, Massachusetts, US

Maverick
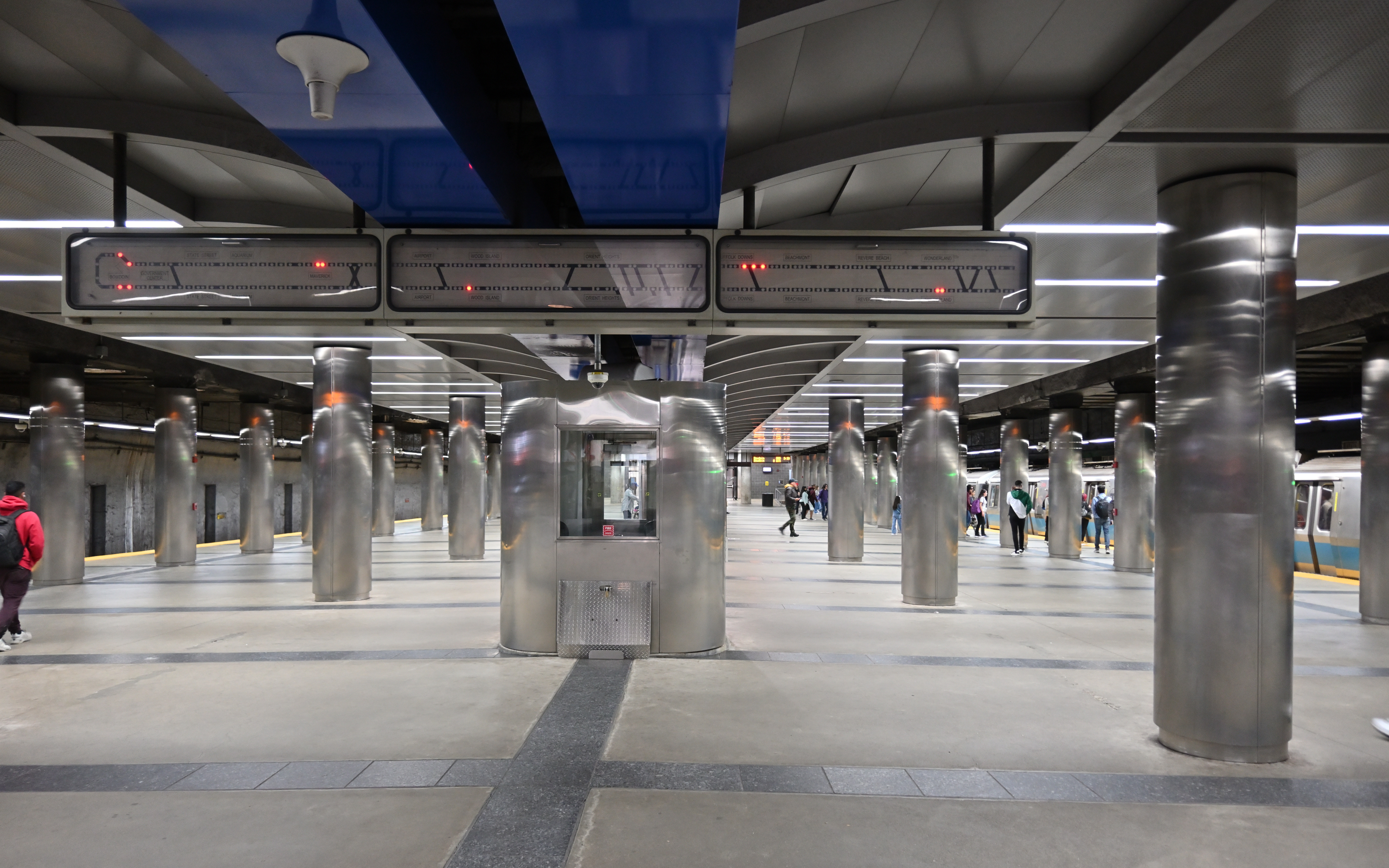
- The platform at Maverick, with an inbound train on the right, and the track map display in the middle

General information
- Location: 220 Sumner Street; East Boston, Boston, Massachusetts
- Coordinates: 42.3691°N 71.0396°W
- Line: East Boston Tunnel
- Platforms: 1 island platform
- Tracks: 2
- Connections: MBTA bus: 114, 116, 120, 121; MBTA ferry: F3 (at Lewis Wharf)

Construction
- Structure type: Underground
- Accessible: yes

History
- Opened: December 5, 1904 as streetcar portal
- Rebuilt: April 21, 1924 (converted to rapid transit); 2005–2009

Passengers
- FY2019: 11,193 daily boardings

Services
Preceding station	MBTA	Following station
Aquarium toward Bowdoin	Blue Line	Airport toward Wonderland
Location

Maverick station (also known as Maverick Square) is a rapid transit station in Boston, Massachusetts. It serves the MBTA's Blue Line and is located at Maverick Square in East Boston. It is the easternmost underground station on the Blue Line and a transfer point to various buses. A center island platform provides access to the surface in the middle of Maverick Square. In the station, a track map lined with light bulbs shows the position of the trains on the Blue Line between Bowdoin and Orient Heights. It was one of the last stations to be converted to 6-car train service as part of the MBTA's Blue Line Renovation Project. Maverick is a terminal for MBTA bus routes 114, 116, 120, and 121.

== History ==
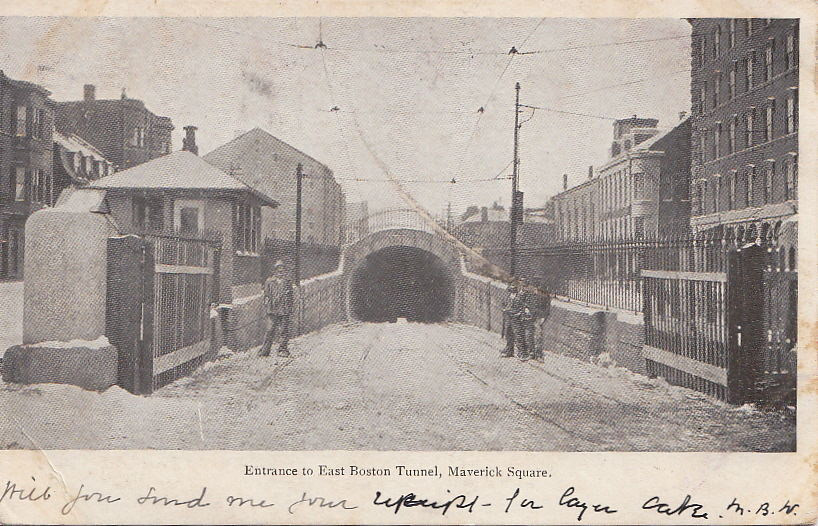
1905 postcard of Maverick Portal

When the East Boston Tunnel originally opened on December 30, 1904, it was a streetcar tunnel with a portal at Maverick, known as Maverick portal or the Maverick incline. There was no station at Maverick; streetcars simply left the portal and continued north on Meridian Street or southeast on Maverick Street.

On April 18–21, 1924, the tunnel was converted to rapid transit and Maverick station opened, with the streetcar loop between the rapid transit platforms. The last streetcar lines to use the underground loop were the 114, 115, 116, 117, 118 and 121; these last ran January 4, 1952, the day before the Revere Extension to the rapid transit line opened. The streetcar loop and portal have since been closed, with parts of the incline now used for pedestrian access. The station has an extra-wide platform as a result of filling in the former streetcar tracks. The abandoned streetcar loop west of the station remains extant.

Construction of ramps for the Big Dig project required relocation of the Blue Line between Airport station and Wood Island station around 1999–2000. Overhead catenary was re-installed between Maverick and Airport stations as part of the work. On November 5, 1999, Maverick replaced Airport as the new transition point between third rail and catenary power.

The MBTA began design work of a renovation of the station in 1998. A $30.8 million construction contract, which also included ventilation work in the East Boston Tunnel, was awarded on May 5, 2005. Construction began with a groundbreaking ceremony on October 4, 2005. The work included extension of the platforms for six-car trains, replacement of the Maverick Square headhouse, addition of a new headhouse on Lewis Mall, and the creation of a dedicated busway in Maverick Square. Both headhouses included an elevator to make the station fully accessible. The Lewis Mall headhouse opened on September 22, 2007, allowing the old Maverick Square headhouse to be demolished that November. The renovation was completed in 2009. The final cost was $56.3 million, which included $12.4 million in change orders – of which $8.9 million was due to design errors by the MBTA.

As of 2024, the city plans to reconfigure Maverick Square, including dedicated bus lanes through the square.
