= Blue Line (MBTA) =

Rapid transit line in Boston

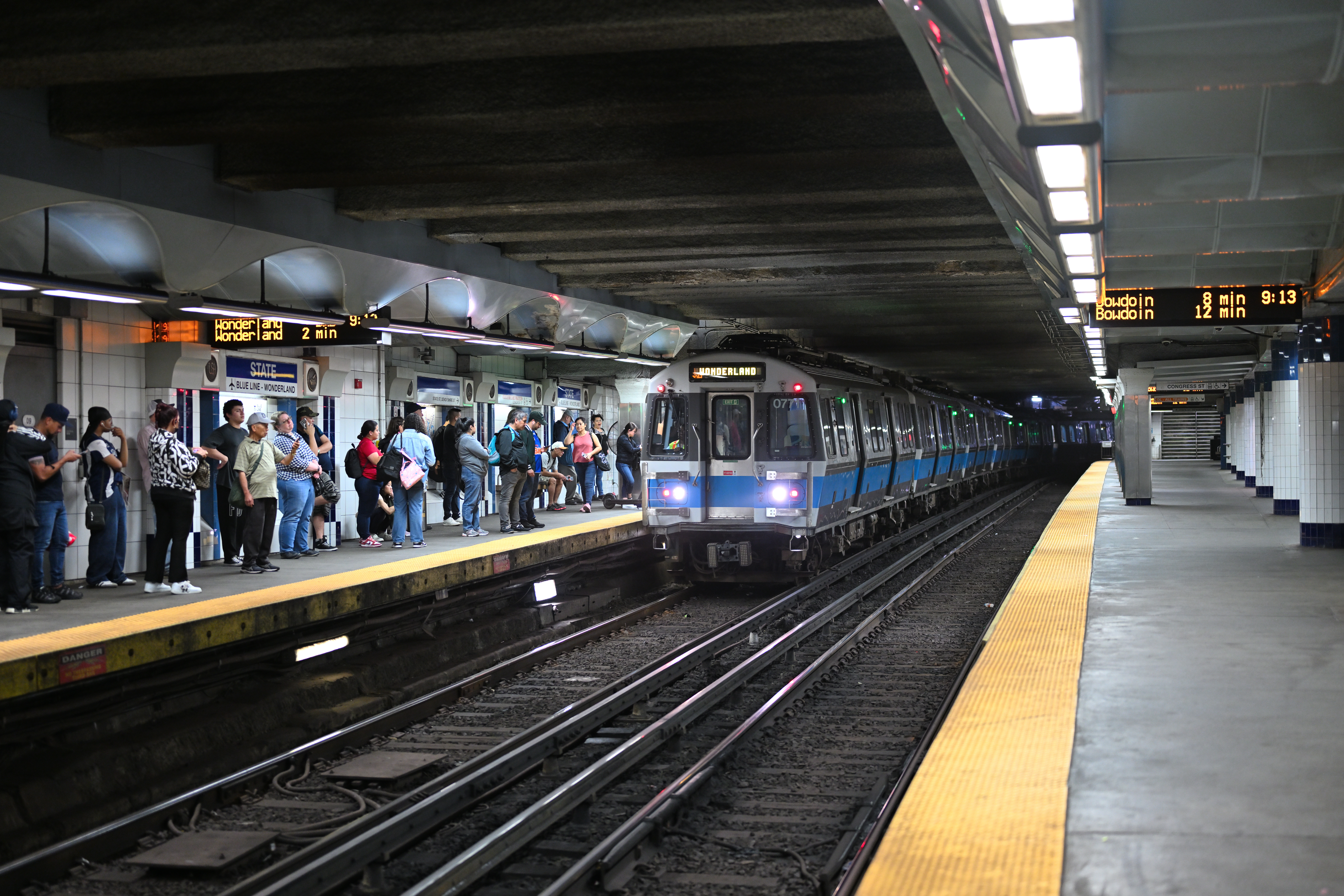
- An eastbound Blue Line train entering State station in 2024

Overview
- Locale: Boston and Revere, Massachusetts
- Termini: Bowdoin; Wonderland
- Stations: 12

Service
- Type: Rapid transit
- System: MBTA subway
- Rolling stock: Siemens Type 5 East Boston
- Daily ridership: 54,989 (July 2026)

History
- Opened: 1904 (streetcar); 1924 (rapid transit); 1952–1954 (Revere extension)

Technical
- Line length: 6.0 miles (9.7 km)
- Track gauge: 4 ft 8 1/2 in (1,435 mm) standard gauge
- Electrification: Overhead line (east of Airport) or third rail (west of Airport), 600 V DC

The Blue Line is a rapid transit line in the Greater Boston metropolitan area, one of four rapid transit lines operated by the Massachusetts Bay Transportation Authority (MBTA). It runs from Bowdoin station in downtown Boston under Boston Harbor to East Boston and Revere on the inner North Shore, where it terminates at Wonderland. The stop at Airport Station, by way of a free shuttle bus, is one of two rapid transit connections to Logan International Airport. In 1967, during a systemwide rebranding, the line was assigned the blue color because it passes under the Boston Harbor. With an end-to-end travel time of less than twenty minutes, the Blue Line is the shortest of Boston's heavy-rail lines and the only line to have both third rail and overhead catenary sections.

The East Boston Tunnel was built as a streetcar tunnel in 1904 with Howard A. Carson as chief engineer; after an extension to Bowdoin in 1916, it was converted to heavy rail metro rolling stock in 1924. In 1952 and 1954 the line was extended along the former route of the Boston, Revere Beach and Lynn Railroad, in a project intended to reach Lynn but ultimately cut short to Wonderland. Further extensions to Lynn and Charles/MGH downtown are long-planned but not yet funded. From approximately 1998–2011, the MBTA made most Blue Line stations fully accessible as part of a larger effort to accommodate 6-car trains on the line. As of 2018, the only station in service on the Blue Line which is not fully accessible is the downtown Boston terminus Bowdoin.

== History ==
=== East Boston Tunnel ===
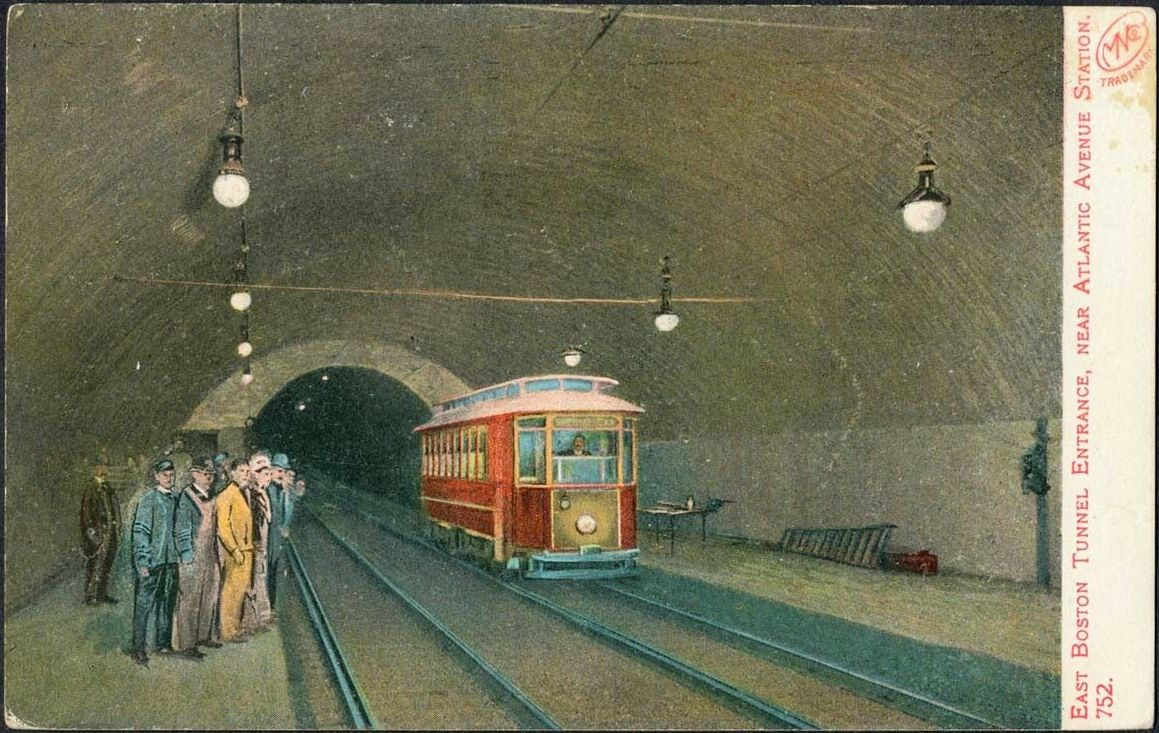
A streetcar at Atlantic Avenue (now Aquarium) station in 1906

The East Boston Tunnel under Boston Harbor was the first North American subway tunnel to run beneath a body of water when it opened in 1904, and the second underwater vehicular tunnel of significant length built in the United States. The tunnel was constructed using a modified version of the Greathead Shield; 2,700 feet (820 m) of the 1 mile (1.6 km) tunnel is actually under water. The excavation took two-and-a-half years, and cost $3 million and the lives of four workmen.

Initially used as a streetcar tunnel, it ran from Maverick Square in East Boston to downtown Boston's Court Street station, with an intermediate stop at Devonshire (now State). Court Street had pedestrian access to Scollay Square station (now Government Center) but transfers to the East Boston Tunnel required an additional fare of 1 cent. In 1906, Atlantic Station (now Aquarium) was opened, with a connection to the Atlantic Avenue Elevated. Court Street proved to be a problematic terminus as its single-track design limited frequent service.

==== Bowdoin extension ====
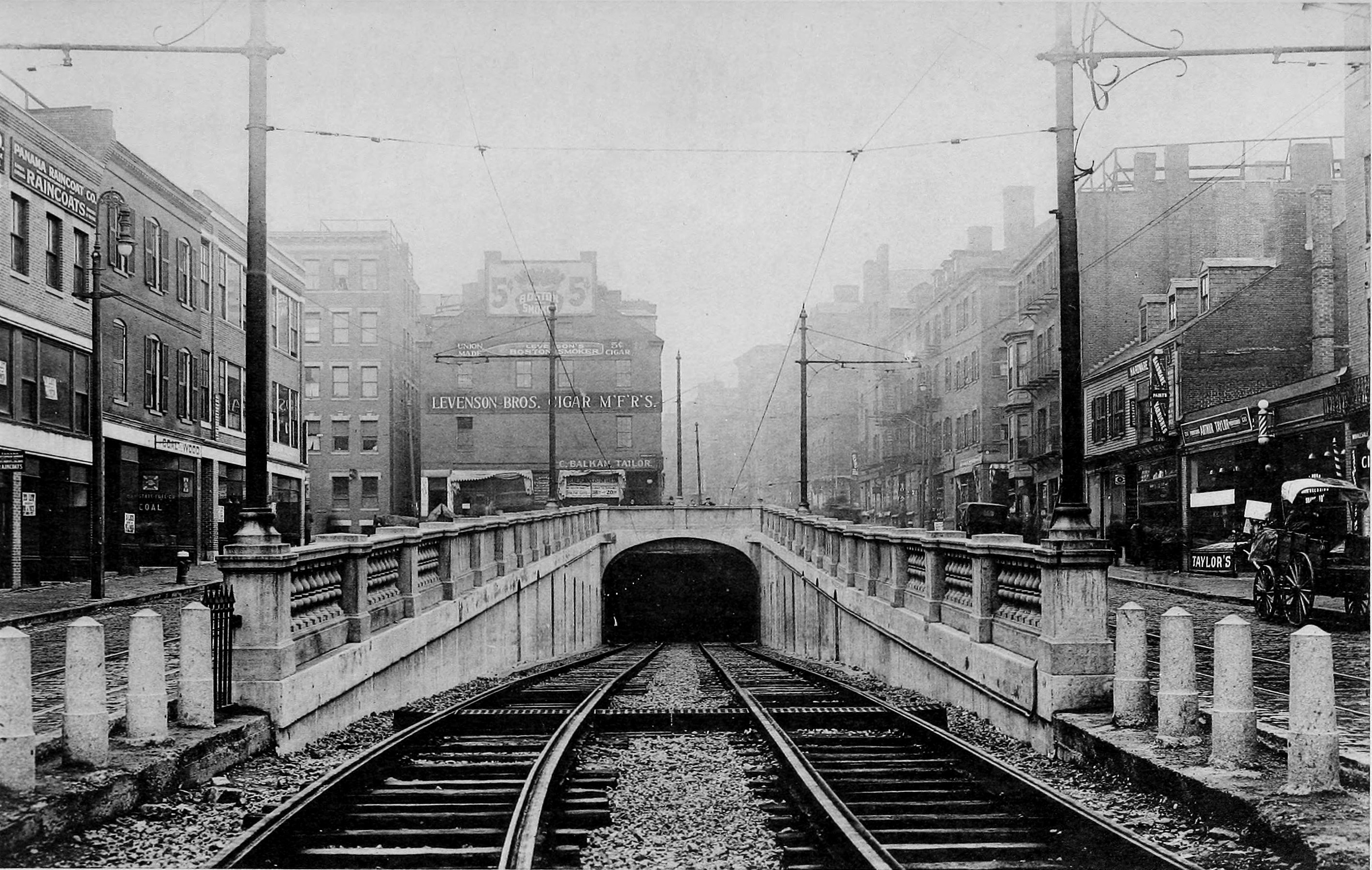
Joy Street Portal in 1915, looking eastwards

The Boston Transit Commission (BTC) began construction of a 0.5-mile (0.8 km) extension of the East Boston Tunnel on November 29, 1912. The extension ran from Scollay Square (where a new platform, Scollay Under, was constructed to replace Court Street station) to a new station and loop at Bowdoin Square. Tracks continued west under Cambridge Street to an incline at Joy Street, where streetcars could continue on surface tracks to Charles Street and the Longfellow Bridge to Cambridge.

Court Street station was abandoned on November 15, 1914, with service cut back to Devonshire. On March 13, 1916, service was extended to the new Scollay Under, with streetcars looping empty around the Bowdoin loop. Bowdoin station opened on March 18 along with the Joy Street Portal, which was used by a Central Square–Orient Heights through line as well as several Cambridge lines that terminated at Scollay Under. The total cost of the extension was $2.4 million.

==== Metro conversion ====
The East Boston Tunnel was originally planned to be operated with high-floor metro rolling stock and connected to the then-planned Cambridge Elevated line. When that plan was dropped in 1903 due to a disagreement between the Boston Transit Commission and the BERy, the stations were built with low platforms. Large bi-loading streetcars (with high floors but capable of loading from low platforms), which incorporated many attributes from metro cars used on the Main Line Elevated, began use in 1905. However, neither these nor the large center-entrance cars introduced in 1917 (which were designed for multiple unit operation) could fully handle the crowds.

In 1921, the Boston Transit Department (BTD)—the successor to the BTC—began work at Maverick Square to convert the East Boston Tunnel to high-floor metro trains. The next year, the BTD board approved the construction of high-level platforms at the four downtown stations. The Maverick Square incline was replaced with Maverick station, which provided cross-platform transfers between tunnel trains and surface streetcars.

Over the weekend of April 18–21, 1924, the East Boston Tunnel was converted to use the new high-floor trains. The tightly staged changeover required 1500 men to complete. Temporary wooden platform sections were put in place to allow service to begin on April 21, with the permanent concrete sections completed over the following months. The edges of the original low platforms can still be seen under the high platforms at State and Aquarium. Rather than modify the narrow tunnel, the BERy elected to replace the streetcars with brand-new smaller-than-usual high-platform rapid transit cars which could operate in tight clearances—particularly around the tight loop at Bowdoin. Blue Line cars are thus 48.5 feet (14.8 m) long, substantially shorter than the 65-foot (20 m) Orange Line cars and the 69.5-foot (21.2 m) Red Line cars.

=== Revere extension ===
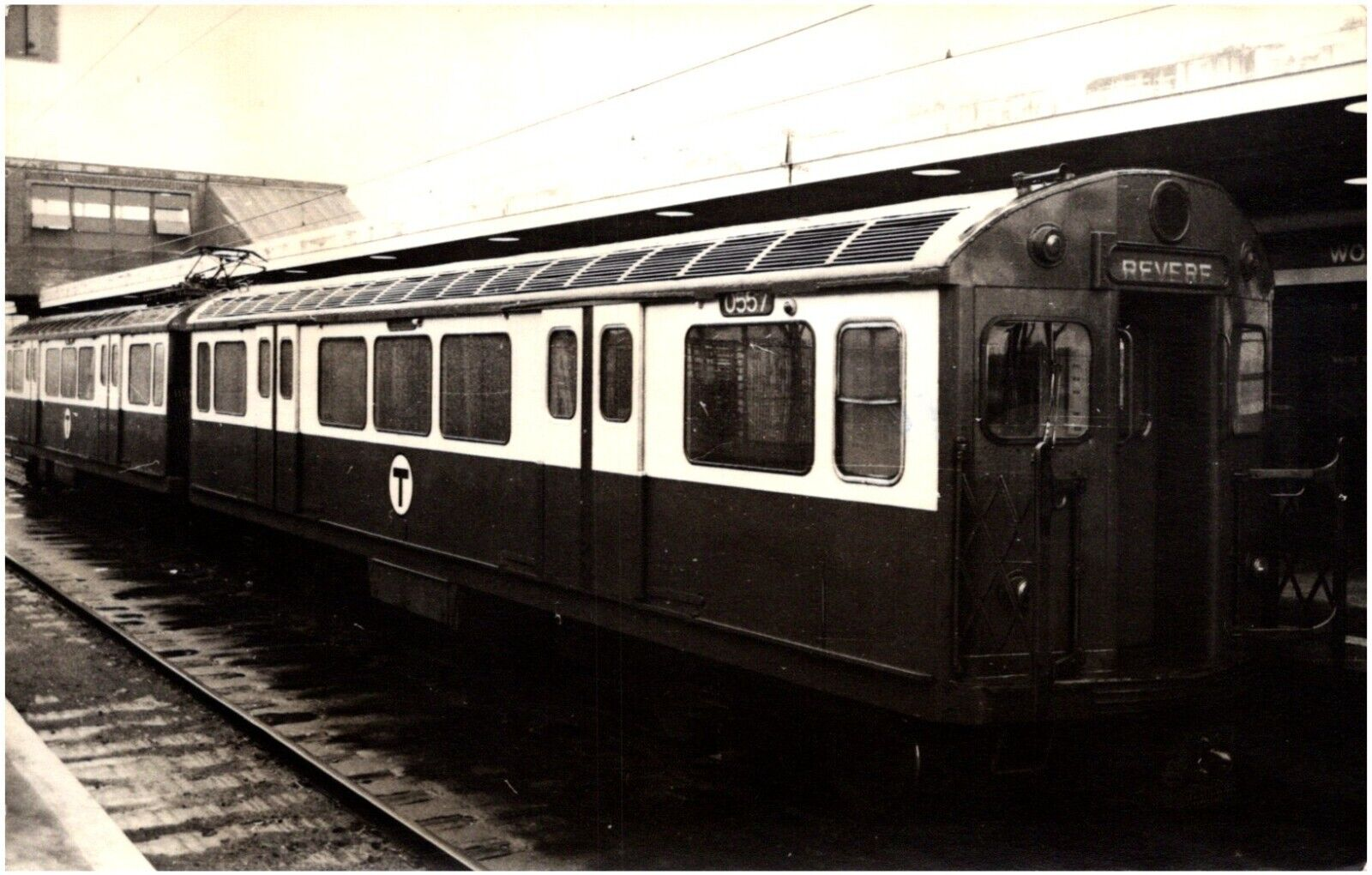
A Blue Line train at Wonderland in 1976

From 1952 to 1954, a surface-level extension was constructed along the recently defunct Boston, Revere Beach and Lynn Railroad, from Maverick to the current terminus at Wonderland. The original trackage had been narrow gauge, but was converted to standard gauge for this Revere Extension of the subway. The first above-ground station on the new extension served Boston's Logan Airport, and was the first American urban transit connection to a commercial airfield. Beyond Maverick, the power feed was changed from third rail to overhead catenary (both at 600 V DC) to reduce the risk of winter ice buildup due to proximity to the ocean.

The line was officially renamed the East Boston Tunnel & Revere Extension by the MTA in 1952, and designated as "Route 3" on system maps. It was renamed as the Blue Line on August 26, 1965, as part of the new MBTA's color-based rebranding. The color blue represented water, as the line passes under Boston Harbor and travels near the coast for much of its length.

Construction of ramps for the Big Dig project required relocation of the Blue Line between Airport station and Wood Island station around 1999–2000. Overhead catenary was re-installed between Maverick and Airport stations as part of the work. On November 5, 1999, Maverick replaced Airport as the new transition point between third rail and catenary power. Until the Silver Line was extended to Logan in 2004–05, the Blue Line was the only rapid transit connection to the airport. On April 21, 2018, the SL3 Silver Line service to Chelsea opened with a connection to the Blue Line at Airport station, providing transfer service to Chelsea, the Seaport District and South Station.

=== Station renovations ===
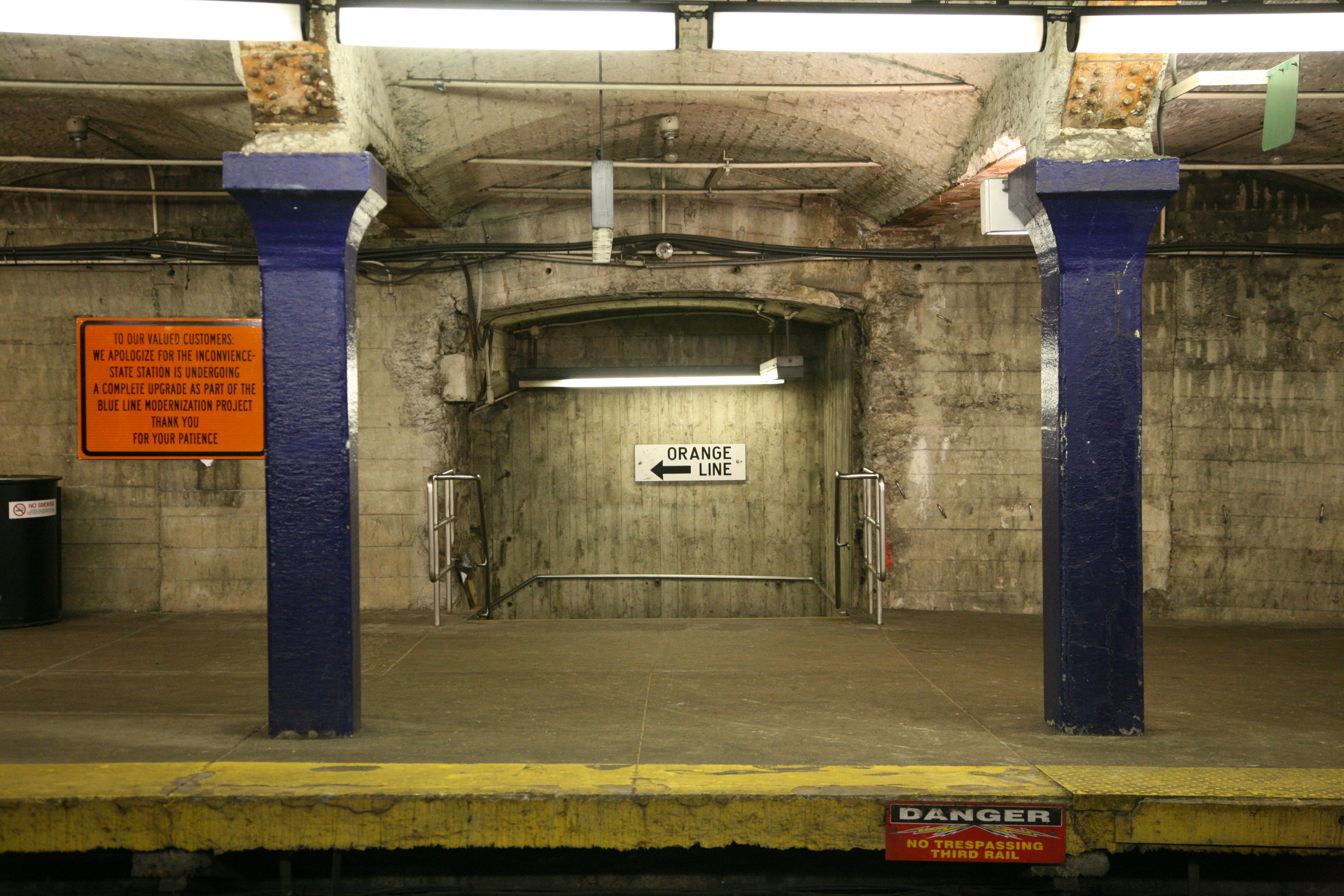
Blue Line level at State station undergoing major renovation in 2007

Unlike the Red Line and Orange Line, which had substantial new sections and station renovations in the 1970s and 1980s, most of the Blue Line had not been substantially modified since 1954. By the 1990 passage of the Americans with Disabilities Act, only Suffolk Downs and the eastbound platform at State were accessible, with Wonderland then under construction. In 1988, the MBTA began planning for accessibility modifications as well as platform extensions to accommodate 6-car trains - similar to what had been done on the Orange and Red lines. The project was then expected to be complete in 1994. In 1989, the MBTA awarded design contracts for modernization and platform lengthening (to accommodate six-car trains) at nine Blue Line stations. Final design on a number of the modifications - the Blue Line Modernization Project - began in 1990–92.

The first main construction phase of the project began on June 25, 1994, the line was cut back to Orient Heights at all times to permit reconstruction of the outer stations. Beachmont and Wood Island were completely rebuilt, while Suffolk Downs, Revere Beach and Wonderland were renovated. A simultaneous $8 million noise reduction program added sound walls at Beachmont and Orient Heights, rubber mats under tracks, and soundproofing of nearby homes. The stations reopened on June 26, 1995. Unlike the other stations, Wood Island was not accessible after the 1994-95 renovation; elevators were not added until 2000.

Aquarium was closed from October 14, 2000, until October 29, 2001, for renovations, which were completed in 2003. A relocated Airport station opened on June 3, 2004. An extensive renovation of State, during which the station remained open, lasted from November 2004 to May 2011. Sequential closures of Wonderland, Wood Island, Revere Beach, and Beachmont stations took place in June through November 2008 for platform repairs.

Reconstruction of Maverick began on October 4, 2005. The project was sufficiently progressed for six-car trains to enter service on September 15, 2008, though the station was not completed until 2009. Orient Heights was closed from March 23 to November 26, 2013, for a complete reconstruction. Government Center closed from March 22, 2014, to March 21, 2016, for a complete renovation and accessibility modifications. This left all Blue Line stations accessible except for Bowdoin, which also has an eastbound platform that cannot be modified for six-car trains.

Service between Bowdoin and Airport was replaced by buses from May 18–31, 2020, and April 25 to May 17, 2022, for track replacement and waterproofing work in the East Boston Tunnel. During the 2022 closure, temporary ferry service between Long Wharf and East Boston was also offered. An additional closure of the outer portion of the line from May 22 to June 8, 2022, allowed for repairs to the Suffolk Downs footbridge. No fares were charged on the Blue Line from July 5 to August 31, 2023, during a closure of the Sumner Tunnel.

== Proposed expansions ==
=== Extension to Lynn ===
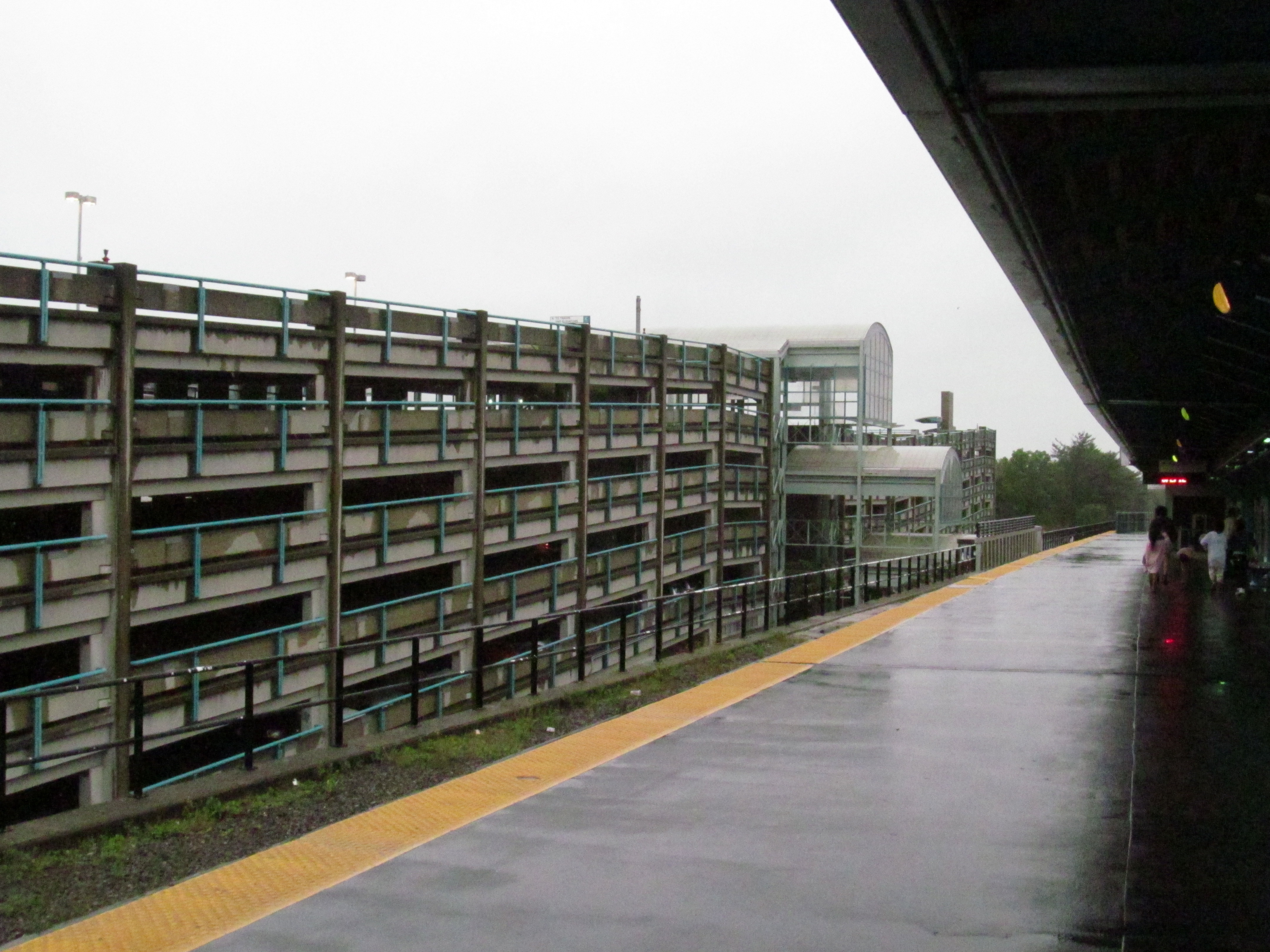
The Lynn station, rebuilt in 1992, was designed to accommodate an extension of the Blue Line. The line would terminate between the commuter rail viaduct and the parking garage.

There is a proposal to extend the Blue Line northward to Lynn, Massachusetts. The land to extend the line was purchased for the initial construction of the Revere Extension, but due to budgetary constraints Wonderland station was designated the northern terminus. Two potential extension routes have been identified. One proposed path would run through marshland alongside the existing Newburyport/Rockport commuter rail line, on rail lines formerly operated by the Boston and Maine Railroad. An alternative route would extend the line alongside Revere Beach Boulevard through Point of Pines and the Lynnway, along the remainder of the BRB&L right of way. Other alternatives include increased commuter rail or bus service, or connecting the Blue Line to a commuter rail stop near Wonderland via a short connector.

The Blue Line extension has been proposed in various forms for over 80 years. The 1926 Report on Improved Transportation Facilities and 1945–47 Coolidge Commission Report recommended that the East Boston Tunnel line, which had been converted to rapid transit from streetcars in 1924, be extended to Lynn via the Boston, Revere Beach & Lynn right-of-way. Ever since the 1954 Revere extension was cut short to Wonderland, a further extension to Lynn has been planned. Following on the 1926 and 1945-47 studies, the 1966 Program for Mass Transportation recommended that the Blue Line be extended to Lynn, while the 1969 Recommended Highway and Transit Plan proposed that the extension run as far as Salem. An extension was not present in the 1972 Final Report of the Boston Transportation Planning Review, but the 1974 Transportation Plan revived the project with possible termini of Lynn, Salem, or even Route 128 in Peabody. The 1978 Program for Mass Transportation report and 1983 Transportation Plan both continued support for an extension to Lynn. Despite the continued recommendations, however, other projects like extensions of the Red and Orange lines were given funding instead of the Blue Line.

In 2005, Lieutenant Governor Kerry Healey estimated construction would begin in 2017. Authorization to bond for planning money for the project was included in an April 2008 state bond bill, and $25 million in federal earmarks have been obtained. A 2004 state bond bill authorized $246.5 million on the condition of finding 50% non-state matching funds (which presumably would come from the federal government). The Draft Environmental Impact Report was expected to be complete by the end of 2008, but was delayed as planners focused on meeting the legal deadline for the Green Line extension to Somerville and Medford.

=== Red Line–Blue Line connector ===
The Blue Line and Red Line are currently the only MBTA subway rail lines without a direct transfer to each other; passengers must ride one stop on the Green or Orange lines to transfer. The proposed Red–Blue connector would extend the Blue Line 0.4 miles (0.64 km) west from Bowdoin to an underground platform at Charles/MGH station, allowing direct transfers to the Red Line.

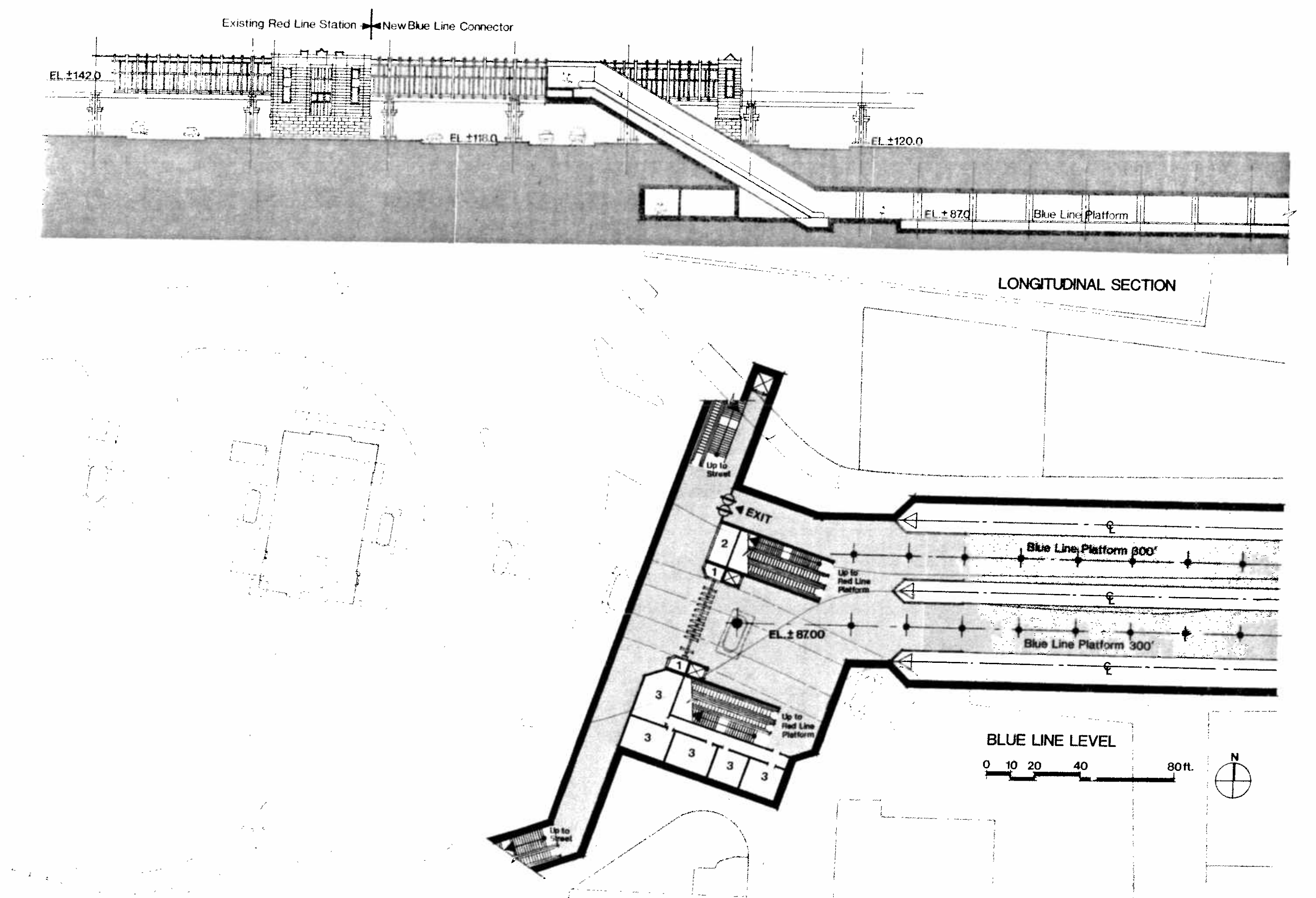
One of three potential designs for the Blue Line level at Charles/MGH from the 1986 study

An extension of the East Boston Tunnel to Charles Street was considered in a 1924 study of Charles station. A 1926 proposal to convert the Tremont Street subway and connecting streetcar lines into a pair of rapid transit trunk lines called for the East Boston Tunnel to be extended south to Park Street station, with through service running between Maverick Square and Brighton using the Commonwealth Avenue line. (Three potential alignment were considered: one running south from Bowdoin, and two running southwest from a relocated Scollay Under.) Regional transportation plans from the 1940s to the early 1970s focused on suburban extensions, with no downtown extension past Bowdoin.

The rise of Kendall Square as a major employment center, the coming of the Red Line Northwest Extension, and increased traffic to Logan Airport created demand in the 1970s for a direct connection between the Red and Blue lines. A 1974 state plan again proposed an extension to Park Street, while the 1978 and 1983 Program for Mass Transportation updates called for an extension to Charles/MGH instead. A 1986 MBTA feasibility study for a Charles/MGH extension called for a cut-and-cover tunnel beginning west of Bowdoin Street with no changes to Bowdoin station. The project was then estimated to cost $79–95 million (equivalent to $191–230 million in 2024). A 1987 cost-effectiveness study estimated 9,030 daily one-way trips over the extension.

In 1991, the state agreed to build a set of transit projects as part of an agreement with the Conservation Law Foundation (CLF), which had threatened a lawsuit over auto emissions from the Central Artery/Tunnel Project (Big Dig). Among the projects was the Red Blue Connector, to be completed by 2011. The 2003–07 reconstruction of Charles/MGH station was designed to accommodate a future Blue Line platform. In 2005, the state replaced the connector with other projects providing equivalent air quality improvements. After a second lawsuit from the CLF, the state agreed in 2006 to complete design of the connector. An Expanded Environmental Notification Form was released in September 2007

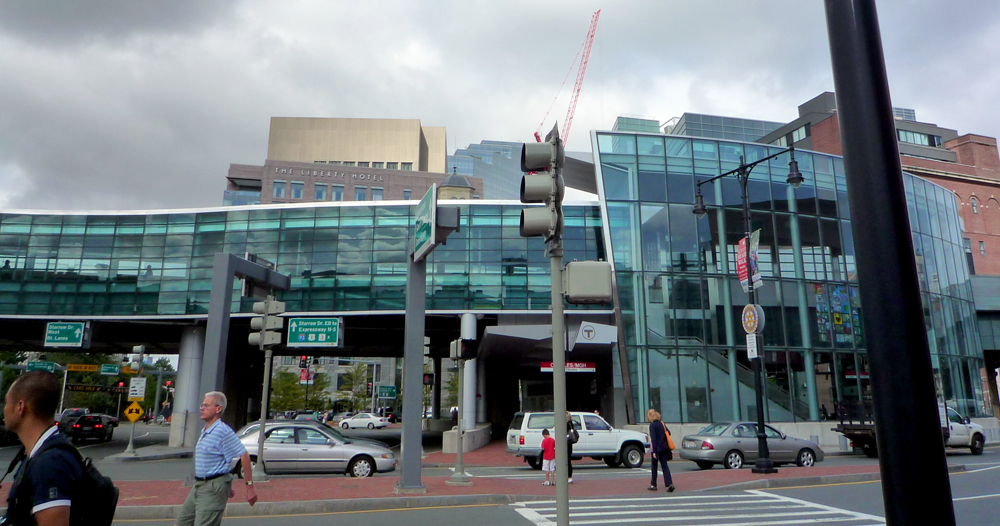
Charles/MGH station was rebuilt with provisions for an eventual underground Blue Line level.

The 2010 Draft Environmental Impact Report (DEIR) instead called for a pair of deeper tunnels bored by a tunnel boring machine (TBM), starting east of Bowdoin station and passing underneath the existing platform. Keeping the existing station and loop was judged infeasible because evacuation from a disabled train would not be possible in the confined loop, and the eastbound platform is not long enough for six-car trains. Use of a TBM rather than cut-and-cover construction was intended to reduce construction cost and limit disruption on Cambridge Street. Alternatives with a replacement Bowdoin station west of Bowdoin Street, and without a replacement station, were considered; the latter was recommended due to lower cost and reduced travel time. The preferred alternative was estimated to cost $748 million and take six years to construct. Daily ridership was estimated to be 18,940 one-way trips in 2030.

Lacking available funding for construction, the MBTA did not complete design of the extension. The possibility of a public-private partnership (P3) to advance the project was studied in 2013. In 2015, the EPA removed the requirement for the MBTA to complete design. In 2018, the state commissioned a $50,000 study to reevaluate tunneling costs; it found that contrary to the 2010 DEIR, cut-and-cover tunneling could be considerably less costly than a TBM, albeit with more surface disruption. Cut-and-cover was estimated to cost $200–250 million for the tunnel costs alone, compared to $300–350 million for TBM and the $413 million estimated in the DEIR. In 2019 and 2023, the MBTA indicated plans to spend $15 million to design the connector in a five-year spending plan.

A conceptual design completed in 2020 called for cut-and-cover construction, with Bowdoin station still planned for closure. The new Blue Line level at Charles/MGH would have entrances from the existing lobby and a new headhouse in an MGH development on the north side of Charles Street. Total project cost was estimated as $850 million ($740 million for construction including 30% contingency, $50 million for design, $30 million in administration costs, and $30 million for additional rolling stock), with construction lasting from 2025 to 2030. A Notice of Project Change was issued on October 2, 2023. In November 2023, the Massachusetts Executive Office of Energy and Environmental Affairs required the MBTA to prepare a Supplemental Draft Environmental Impact Report.

A 2018 MBTA long-range planning document considered a pedestrian tunnel between the Orange Line platforms at State and Downtown Crossing, which would allow transfers between the Red and Blue lines similar to (though longer than) the Winter Street Concourse between the Green and Orange lines.

==== Previous connection ====
A physical rail connection between the Red and Blue Lines existed in the early part of the 20th century (prior to the MBTA assigning the color designations of the subway lines). Railcars from what is today the Blue Line could emerge from a ramp portal surfacing between Joy Street and Russell Street, just beyond Bowdoin station. The railcars would run on former streetcar track down Cambridge Street and then most of the distance to the western end of the Longfellow Bridge, connecting to what is now the Red Line just east of its Cambridge subway portal, near what is now Kendall/MIT station. Because the tracks were unpowered, individual cars had to be towed along the street at night. This connection was never used in passenger service, but was used to transport Blue Line cars to the Eliot Street Yard maintenance shops then located near Harvard Square station. When the Blue Line eventually got its own maintenance shops, the connection was removed and the ramp portal was permanently covered in 1952.

== Station listing ==
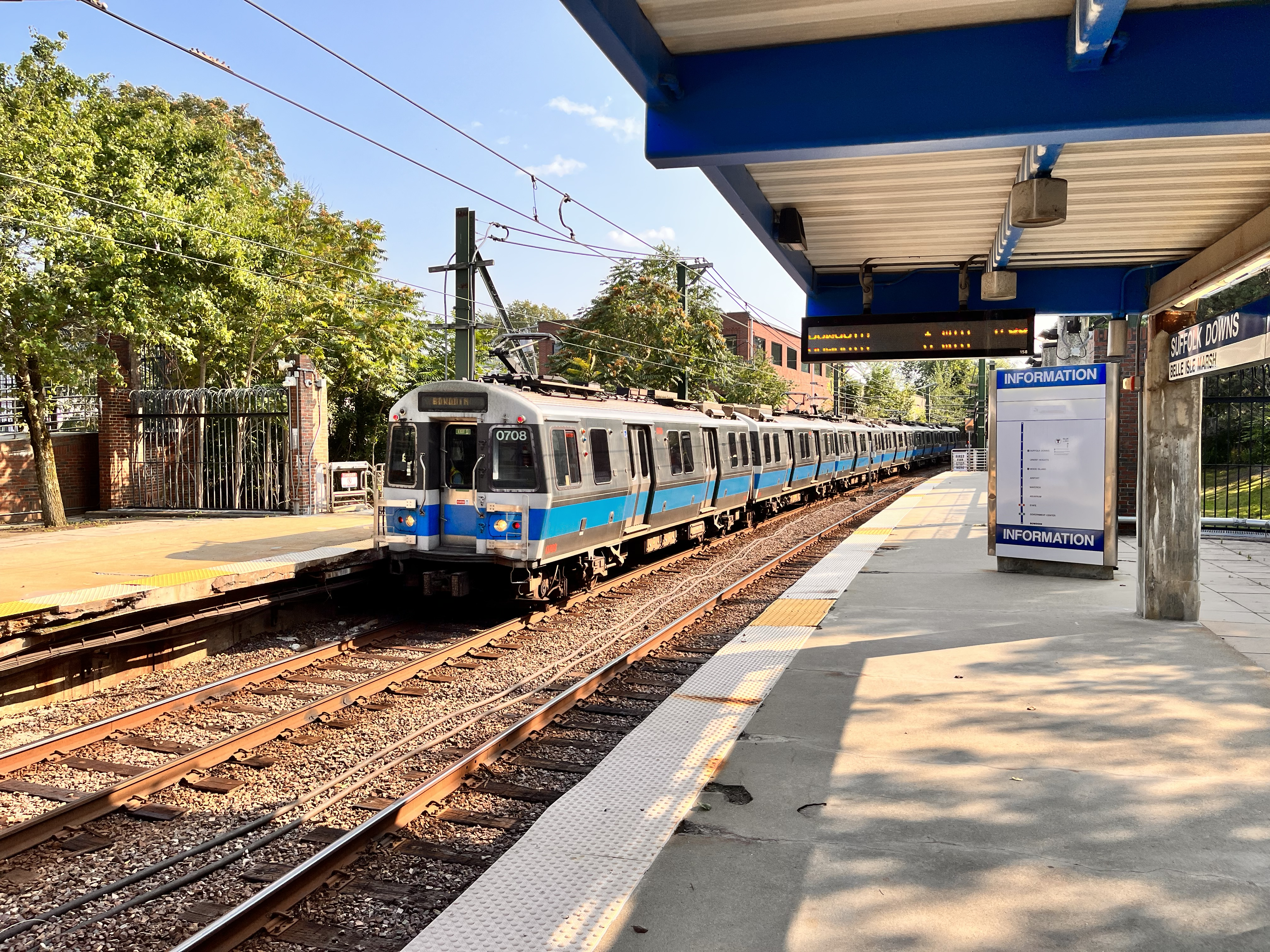
An outbound train arriving at Suffolk Downs station

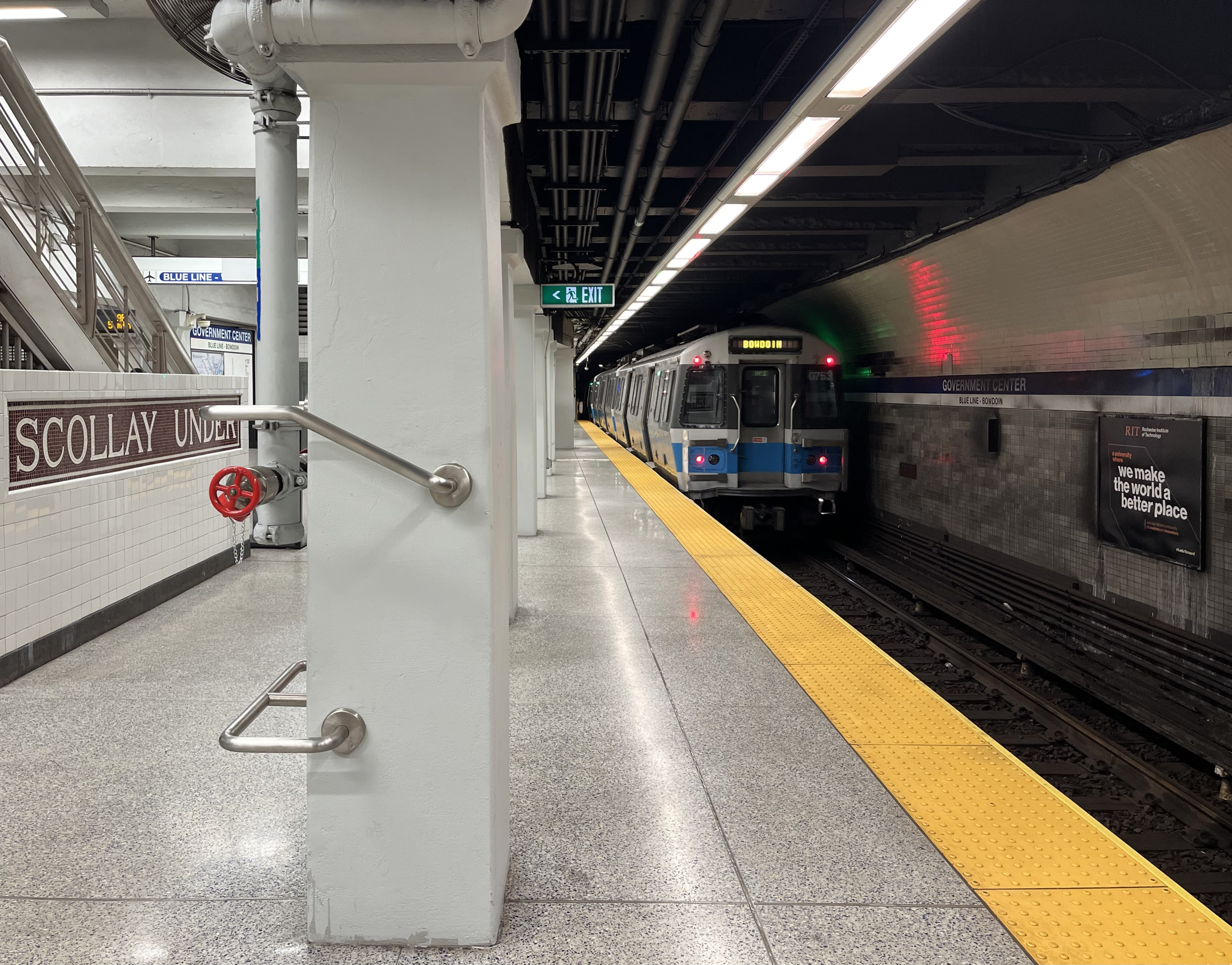
An inbound train departing Government Center station

Location	Station	Opened	Notes and connections
Revere	Wonderland	January 19, 1954	MBTA bus: 110, 116, 411, 424, 426W, 439, 441, 442, 450W, 455
Revere	Revere Beach	January 19, 1954	MBTA bus: 110, 411
Revere	Beachmont	January 19, 1954	MBTA bus: 119
East Boston	Suffolk Downs	April 21, 1952	—
East Boston	Orient Heights	January 5, 1952	MBTA bus: 120, 712, 713
East Boston	Wood Island	January 5, 1952	MBTA bus: 112, 120, 121
East Boston	Airport	January 5, 1952	MBTA subway: Silver Line (SL3); MBTA bus: 104, 171; Massport shuttle: 22, 33, 55, 66, 88
East Boston	Maverick	April 18, 1924	Streetcar portal opened on December 30, 1904; MBTA bus: 114, 116, 120, 121; MBTA ferry: (at Lewis Wharf): F3
Downtown Boston	Aquarium	April 5, 1906	MBTA bus: 4 MBTA ferry: F2H, F3, F4, F5 (at Long Wharf); F6, F7, F8, F10 (at Central Wharf)
Downtown Boston	State	December 30, 1904	MBTA subway: Orange Line; MBTA bus: 4, 92, 93, 354
Downtown Boston	Government Center	March 18, 1916	Court Street station was previously open from December 30, 1904, to November 15, 1914; MBTA subway: Green Line; MBTA bus: 354
Downtown Boston	Bowdoin	March 18, 1916	—

== Rolling stock ==
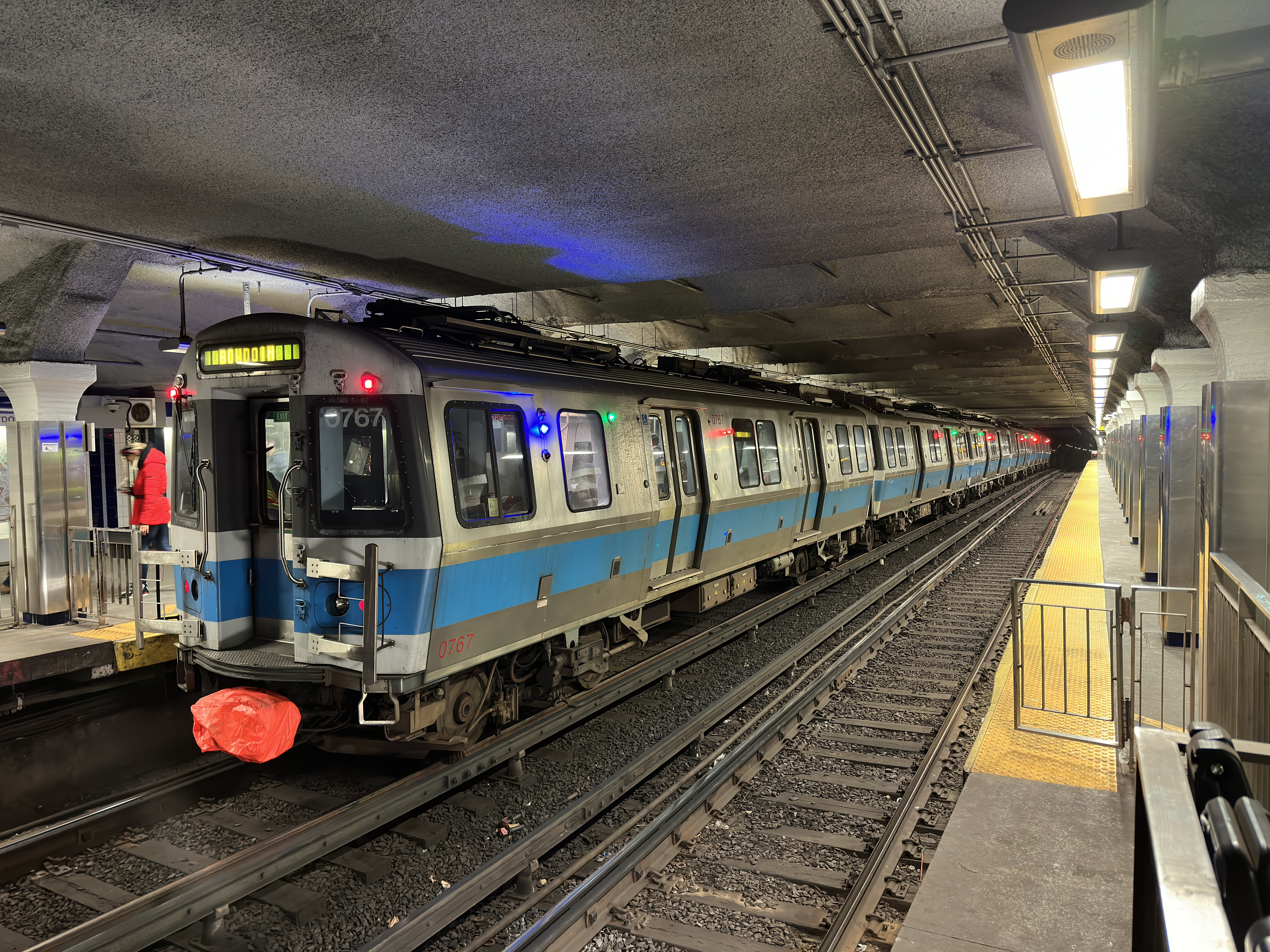
700 series cars at State

=== Current ===
Like the Orange Line and Red Line, the Blue Line tracks are standard-gauge heavy rail. The Blue Line fleet comprises 94 700-series cars (47 pairs) with stainless steel bodies from Siemens, with each car 48 feet (15 m) long and 9 feet 3 inches (2.82 m) wide, with two pairs of doors per side. Uniquely among MBTA rolling stock, Blue Line cars use both third rail power and pantograph current pickup from overhead catenary wires. The overhead pantograph was implemented to avoid third rail icing that frequently occurs in winter. Third rail power is used in the original Blue Line tunnels, which are smaller than most modern subway tunnels. Trains switch between the two modes at Airport station, near where the line transitions between running in a tunnel and running above ground. Previously, the switchover was made underground at Maverick station.

The MBTA awarded the $174 million construction contract for the 94 cars in November 2001, with a total program cost of $200 million. The first deliveries were scheduled for January 2004, but ultimately delayed to 2007 due to manufacturing issues. The first set entered revenue service on February 20, 2008. The first three six-car trains began operating on September 15, 2008; by February 2009, eight of thirteen trainsets used at rush hour were six-car sets. By November 2009, all service was with six-car trains.

By February 2023, service was scheduled to operate at 5 to 5.5-minute headways at weekday peak hours and 9 to 11 minutes at other times. Peak service used 10–12 trains (60–72 cars), while other service used 5–6 trains (30–36 cars). The MBTA expects to replace the current fleet in the mid-2030s after a 25-year operating lifespan. A 130-car fleet is planned to replace the existing 94-car fleet.

=== Former ===
The first generation of high-floor rolling stock on the line were the No. 1 and No. 2 East Boston Rapid Transit cars, which were built by Pullman-Standard in 1923–1924 when the line was converted from streetcar operation to rapid transit. These were supplemented by the No. 3 fleet, built in 1951 by St. Louis Car Company, which was acquired for the Revere Extension. Cars in these earlier fleets were numbered in the 0500 series.

The Nos. 1–3 fleets were replaced by 70 cars in the 0600 series (No. 4 cars), built 1978–1980 by Hawker Siddeley Canada Car and Foundry of Thunder Bay, Ontario, Canada. They were 48 feet 10 inches (14.88 m) long and 9 feet 3 inches (2.82 m) wide, with two pairs of doors on each side. The design was based on the PA3 model used by PATH in New Jersey. They were narrower and shorter than otherwise similar ones running on the Orange Line, due to the stations and tunnels on the Blue Line having been originally designed to accommodate streetcars. In late 2009, the Seashore Trolley Museum received retired Hawker set 622–623 for their collection. By 2011, most of the 600-series cars were retired because of severe corrosion from the salty ocean air. Several 600-series cars were retained on MBTA property but no longer usable. Parts of scrapped cars were used to maintain Orange Line 1200 series rolling stock, which were built at the same time by Hawker Siddeley and used many of the same components. In 2012, set 616–617 was placed in the former Broadway streetcar tunnel for use in emergency training.

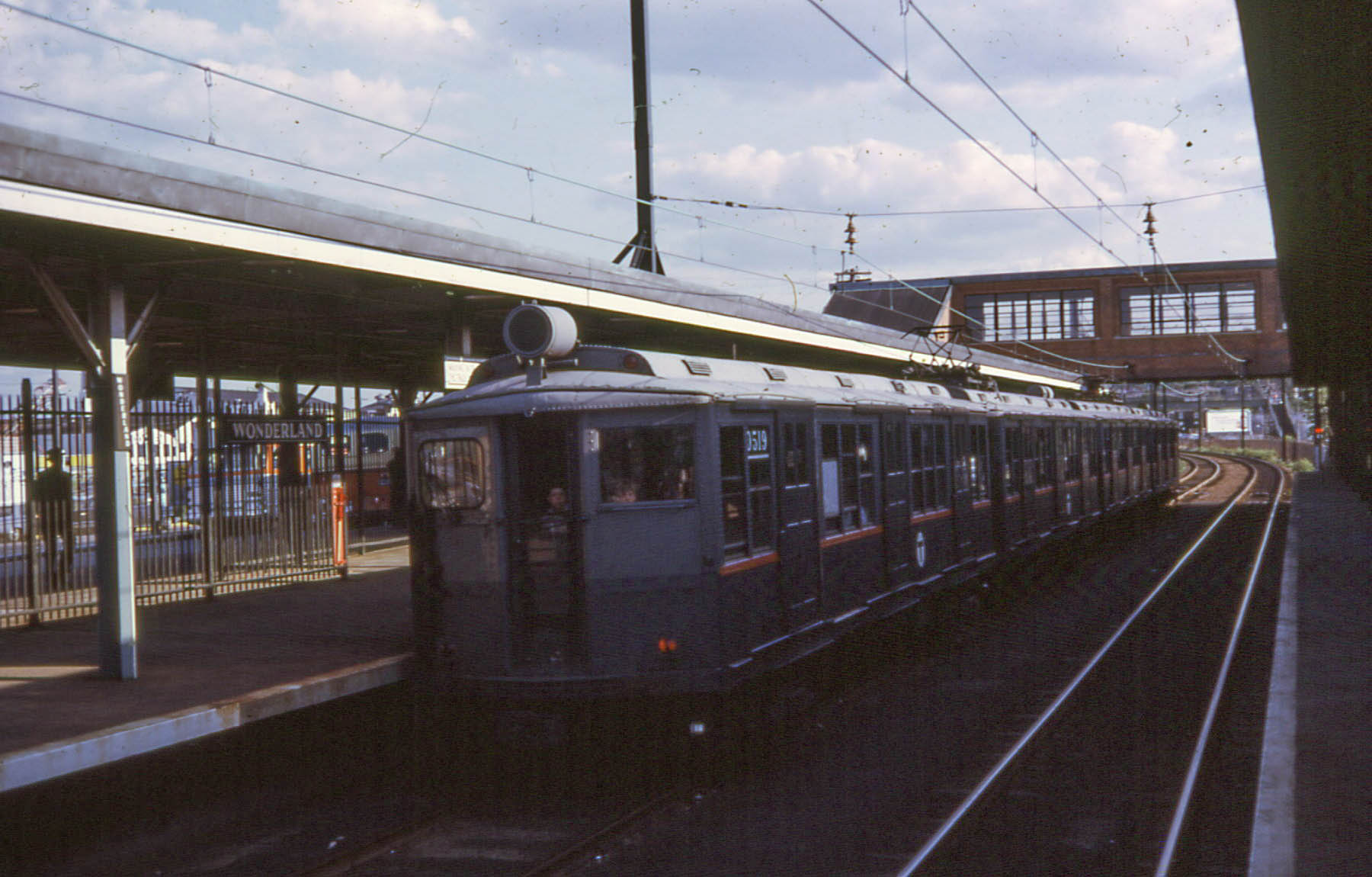
No. 1 cars at Wonderland in 1967

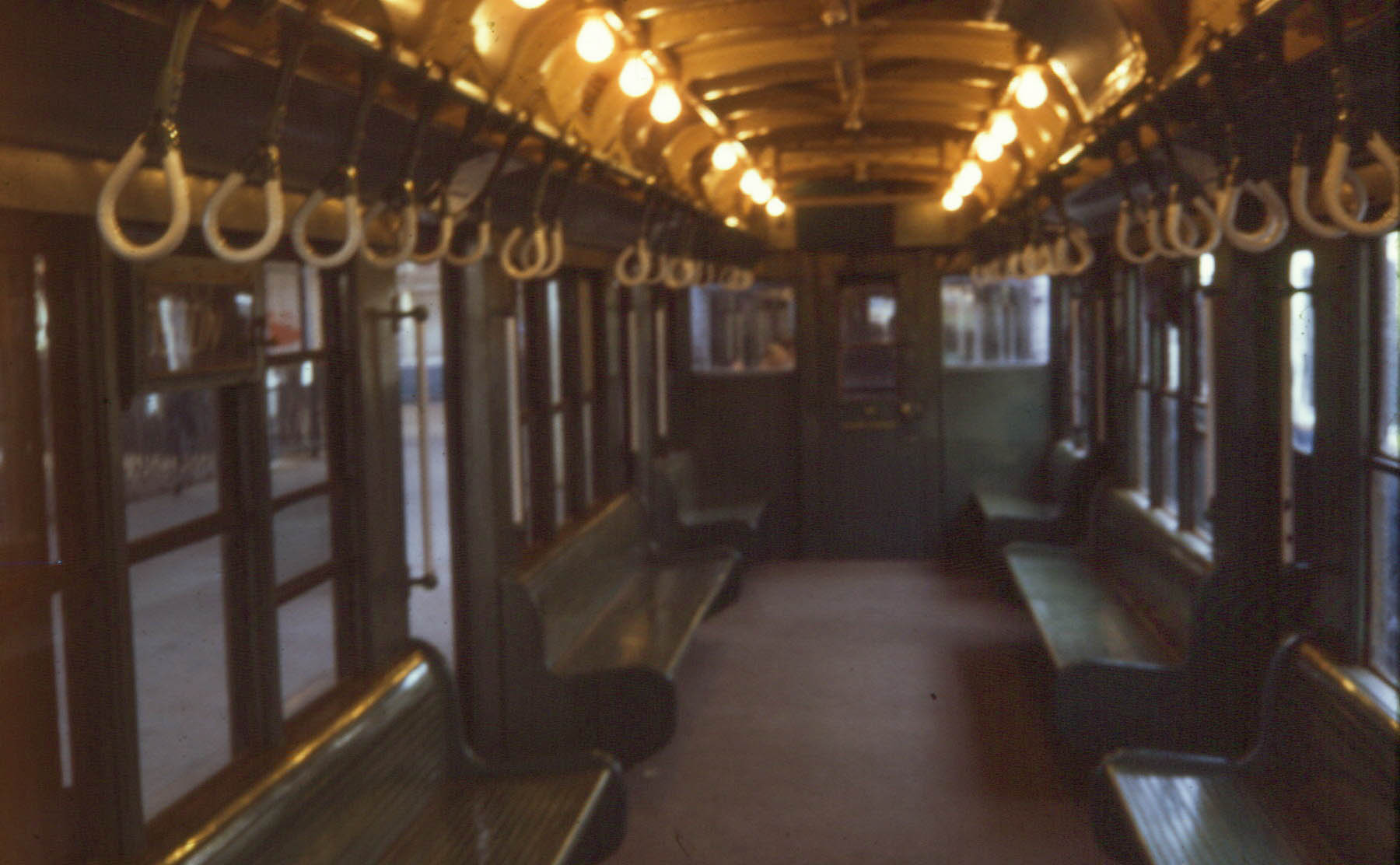
Interior of a No. 1 or No. 2 car

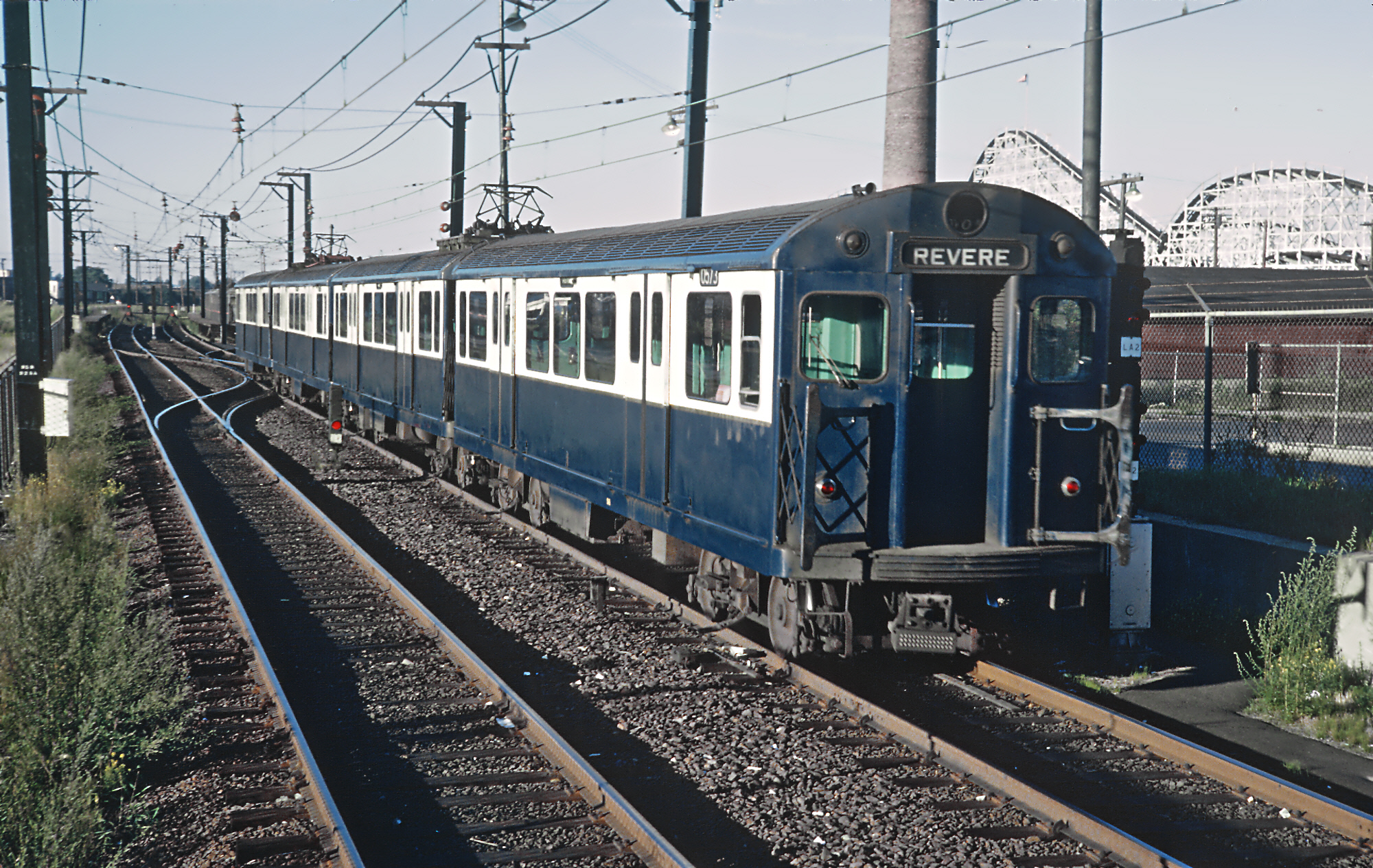
No. 3 cars near Wonderland in 1965

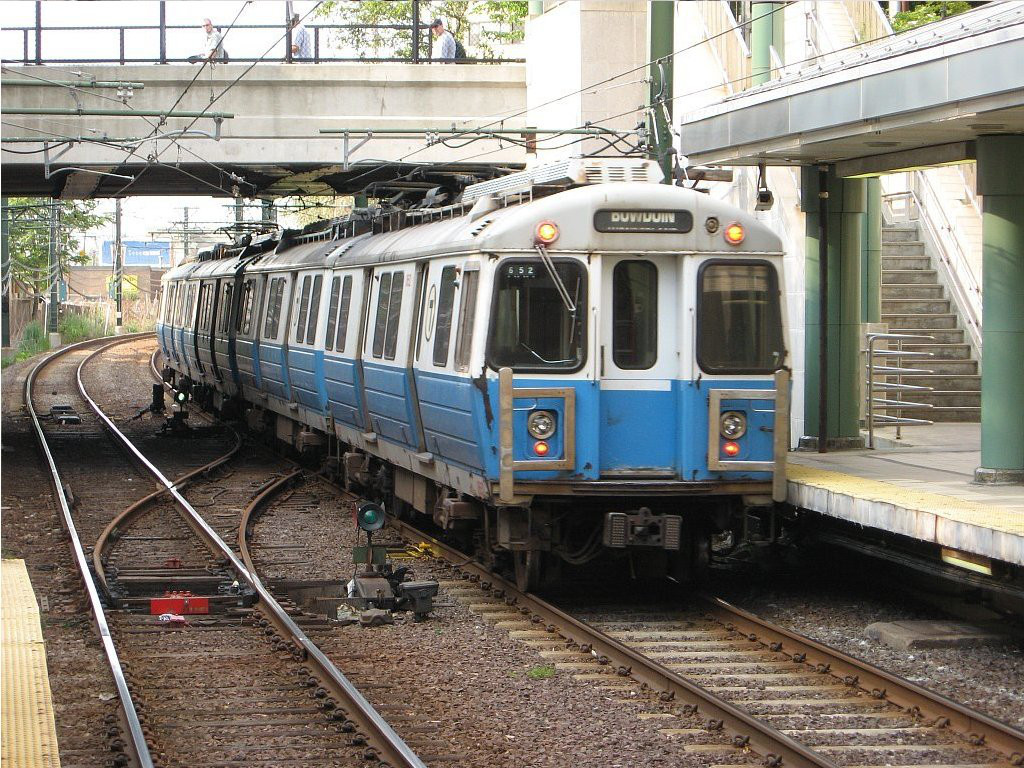
No. 4 cars at Revere Beach in 2007

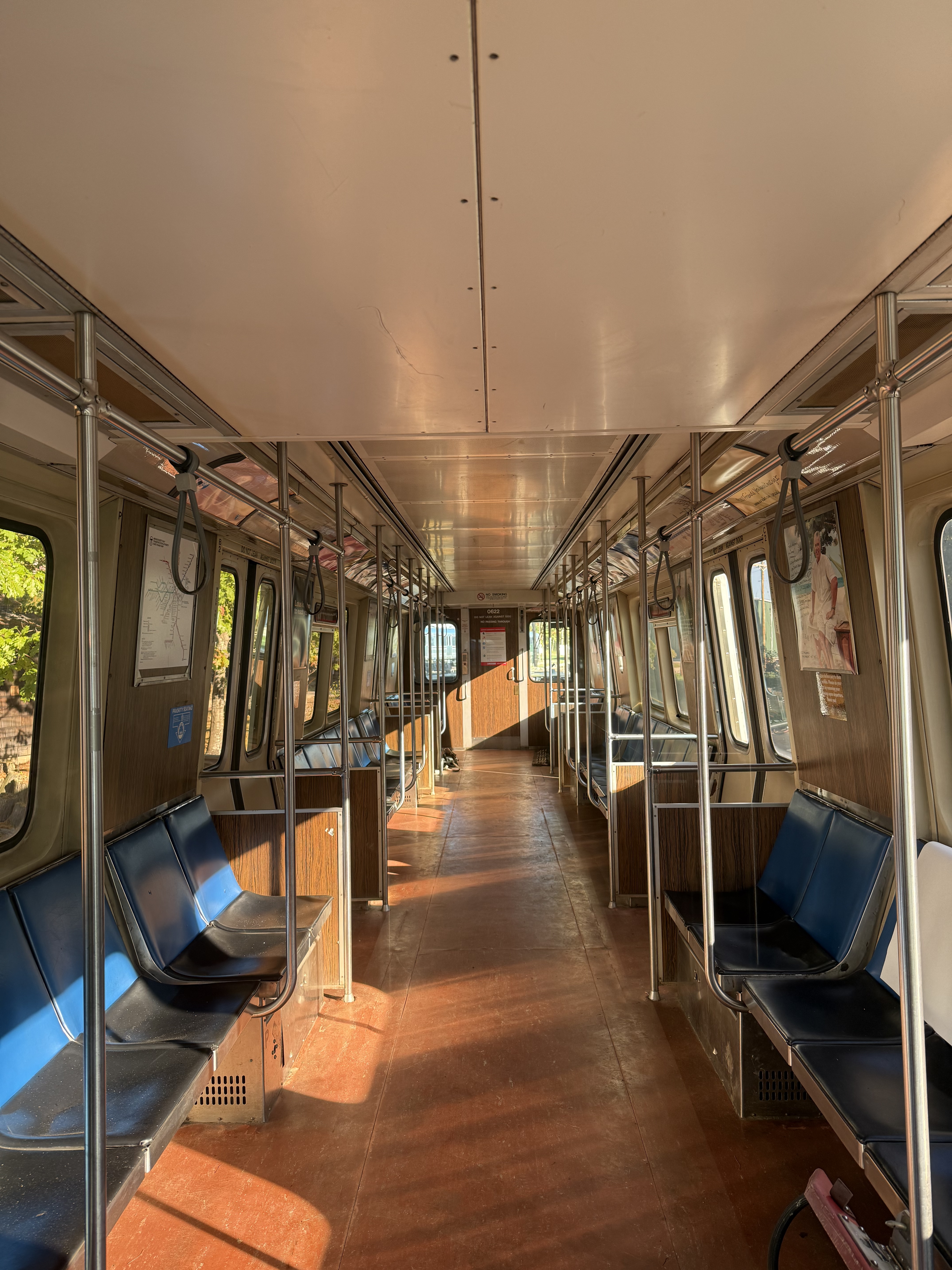
Interior of a No. 4 car
