= Wheel arrangement =

Classification system for rolling stocks

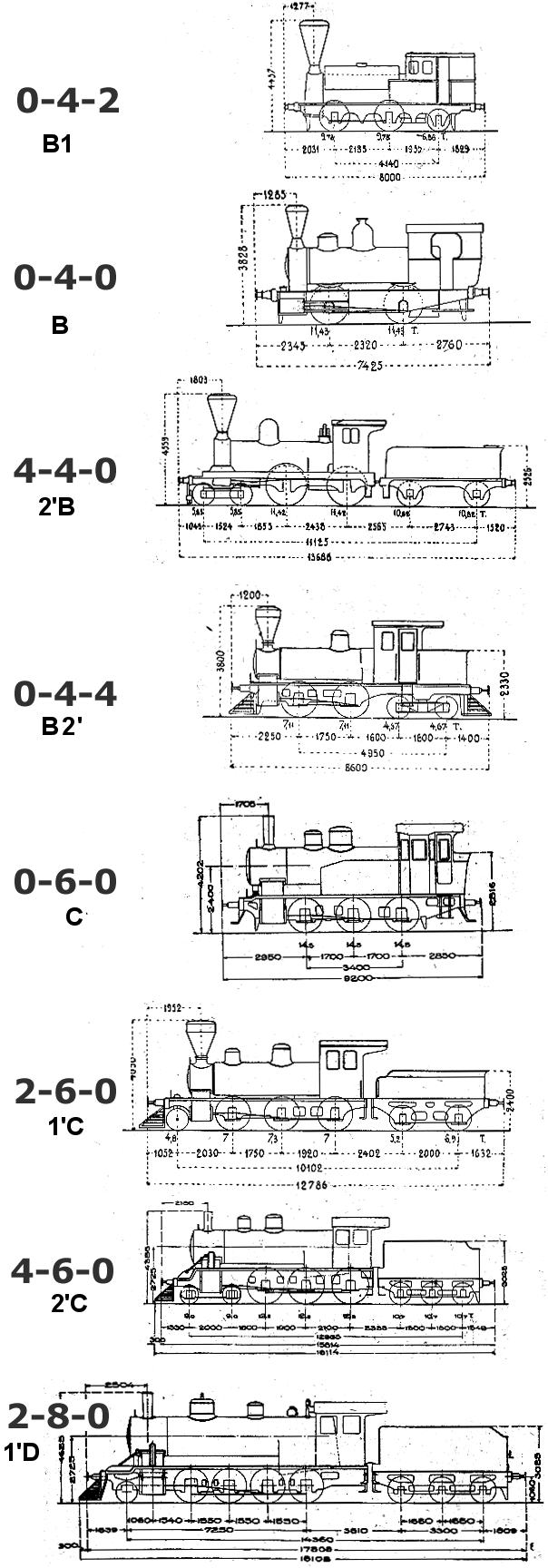
Locomotives of different types (Whyte and UIC wheel notation)

In rail transport, a wheel arrangement or wheel configuration is a system of classifying the way in which wheels are distributed under a locomotive. Several notations exist to describe the wheel assemblies of a locomotive by type, position, and connections, with the adopted notations varying by country. Within a given country, different notations may also be employed for different kinds of locomotives, such as steam, electric, and diesel powered.

Especially in steam days, wheel arrangement was an important attribute of a locomotive because there were many different types of layout adopted, each wheel being optimised for a different use (often with only some being actually "driven"). Modern diesel and electric locomotives are much more uniform, usually with all axles driven.

== Major notation schemes ==
The main notations are the Whyte notation (based on counting the wheels), the AAR wheel arrangement notation (based on counting either the axles or the bogies), and the UIC classification of locomotive axle arrangements (based on counting either the axles or the bogies).

The Whyte notation is generally used for steam locomotives throughout the United States, Canada, the United Kingdom and Ireland. For diesels and electrics, North America uses the AAR wheel arrangement scheme while British practice uses a slightly simplified form of the European UIC classification scheme (except for small diesel shunters, where Whyte notation is used).

In mainland Europe, the UIC classification scheme is generally used for all locomotive types including steam, with some exceptions. In France, the UIC classification is used for diesels and electrics while a scheme similar to the Whyte notation, but counting axles instead of wheels, is used for steam locomotives. Notably, Switzerland had its own separate notation system until 1989, with the Swiss locomotive and railcar classification now only retained for its narrow-gauge railways.

- AAR wheel arrangement - Used largely throughout the US and Canada for diesel and electric locomotives.
- UIC classification - Used in mainland Europe for all locomotive types. Used in the UK for electric and large diesel locomotives.
- Whyte notation - Used in North America, the UK and Ireland for steam locomotives, and for shunter locomotives (US: switcher locomotives) in the UK.

== Comparison of wheel arrangements and wheel picture ==
VDEV/VMEV/UIC-system	Whyte-notation	American name	Picture scheme Locomotive front is to the left
A1	0-2-2	Northumbrian	
A2	0-2-4		
1A	2-2-0	Planet	
1A1	2-2-2	Single, Jenny Lind, Patentee	
1A2	2-2-4	Aerolite	
2′A	4-2-0	Jervis	
2′A1	4-2-2		
2A2	4-2-4	Huntington	
3A	6-2-0	Crampton	
N/A	0-3-0		
B	0-4-0	Four-Wheel-Switcher	
B1	0-4-2	Olomana	
B2′	0-4-4	Forney four-coupled	
B3′	0-4-6		
1B	2-4-0	Porter	
1′B1′	2-4-2	Columbia	
1B2′	2-4-4	Forney, Mason Bogie	
1B3′	2-4-6		
2′B	4-4-0	American, Eight-Wheeler	
2′B1′	4-4-2	Atlantic	
2′B2′	4-4-4	Jubilee (CA), Reading (US)	
2′B3′	4-4-6		
C	0-6-0	Six-Wheel-Switcher	
C1	0-6-2	Webb, Branchline	
C2′	0-6-4		
1′C	2-6-0	Mogul	
1′C1′	2-6-2	Prairie	
1′C2′	2-6-4	Adriatic, Lionel	
1′C3′	2-6-6		
2′C	4-6-0	Ten-Wheeler	
2′C1′	4-6-2	Pacific	
2′C2′	4-6-4	Hudson (NYC), Baltic (MR), Shore Line (NH)	
D	0-8-0	Eight-Wheel-Switcher	
D1	0-8-2	Transfer	
D2′	0-8-4		
D3′	0-8-6		
1′D	2-8-0	Consolidation	
1′D1′	2-8-2	Mikado, MacArthur (USATC)	
1′D2′	2-8-4	Berkshire, Kanawha (C&O), Lima (B&M)&(IC)	
1′D3′	2-8-6		
2′D	4-8-0	Twelve-Wheeler, Mastodon	
2′D1′	4-8-2	Mountain, Mohawk (NYC), New Haven (NH)	
2′D2′	4-8-4	Northern, General Service (SP), Golden State (SP), Niagara (NYC), Wyoming (LV), Potomac (WM), Confederation (CN), Dixie (NC&St.L), Greenbrier (C&O), Laurentian (D&H), Montana (GN), Pocono (Lackawanna),	
2D3	4-8-6		
3′D3′	6-8-6	Turbine (Pennsylvania Railroad Steam Turbine)	
E	0-10-0	Ten-Wheel Switcher	
E1′	0-10-2	Union	
1′E	2-10-0	Decapod	
2′E	4-10-0	Mastodon, El Gobernador,	
1′E1′	2-10-2	Santa Fe, Decapod (SP), Central (IC)	
1′E2′	2-10-4	Texas, Selkirk (CP), Colorado (CB&Q)	
2′E1′	4-10-2	Southern Pacific, Overland (UP)	
F	0-12-0	Pennsylvania, Twelve-Wheel-Switcher	
1′F	2-12-0	Centipede	
1′F1′	2-12-2	Javanic	
2′F1′	4-12-2	Union Pacific	
2′G2′	4-14-4	Soviet (AA)	
A′A	0-2-2-0		
B′B	0-4-4-0	nameless (Mallet)	
B′B1	0-4-4-2	nameless (Mallet)	
2′BB2′	4-4-4-4	nameless (Pennsylvania Railroad Duplex)	
3′BB3′	6-4-4-6		
2′CB2′	4-6-4-4	nameless (Pennsylvania Railroad Duplex)	
C′C	0-6-6-0	Old Maude (Mallet)	
(1′C)C	2-6-6-0	nameless (Mallet)	
(1′C)C1′	2-6-6-2	nameless (Mallet)	
(1′C)C2′	2-6-6-4	nameless (Simple articulated)	
(2′C)C2′	4-6-6-4	Challenger (Simple articulated)	
(1′C)C3′	2-6-6-6	Allegheny, Blue Ridge (Simple articulated)	
D′D	0-8-8-0	Angus (Mallet)	
(1′D)D	2-8-8-0	Bull Moose (Mallet)	
(1′D)D1′	2-8-8-2	Chesapeake (C&O), Cab Forward (SP) (Mallet)	
(1′D)D2′	2-8-8-4	Yellowstone (Simple articulated)	
(2′D)D1′	4-8-8-2	Cab Forward (Simple articulated)	
(2′D)D2′	4-8-8-4	Big Boy (Simple articulated)	
(1′E)E1′	2-10-10-2	Virginian (Mallet)	
(1′D1′)(1′D1′)	2-8-2+2-8-2	Nameless, Garratt	
(2′C1′)(1′C2′)	4-6-2+2-6-4	nameless (Garratt)	
(2′C2′)(2′C2′)	4-6-4+4-6-4	nameless (Garratt)	
(2′D)(D2′)	4-8-0+0-8-4	nameless (Garratt)	
(2′D1′)(1′D2′)	4-8-2+2-8-4	Double Mountain (Garratt)	
(2′D2′)(2′D2′)	4-8-4+4-8-4	nameless (Garratt)	

== Geared steam locomotives ==
Geared steam locomotives such as Shays, Heislers, and Climaxes do not have a standard wheel arrangement classification system. Instead of being classified by wheel arrangement, they are classified by their design and their number of trucks.

No. of trucks	American name	Picture scheme
2-truck	Class A Shay, Class B Shay, Class A Climax, Class B Climax, Heisler	oo oo
3-truck	Class C Shay, Class D Shay, Class C Climax, Heisler	oo oo oo

== See also ==
- Bo-Bo
- Bo-Bo-Bo
- Co-Co locomotives
