= Class 73 =

Class 73 or 73 class may refer to:

- British Rail Class 73, a British electro-diesel locomotive
- DRG Class 73, a class of German passenger tank engines with a 2-4-4T wheel arrangement operated by the Deutsche Reichsbahn and comprising:
  - 73 001 to 028: Palatine P 2.II
  - 73 031 to 124: Bavarian D XII
  - 73 131 to 139: Bavarian Pt 2/5 N
  - 73 201: Bavarian Pt 2/5 H
- New South Wales 73 class locomotive, diesel-hydraulic locomotives
- NSB Class 73, a Norwegian electric multiple unit
