= Class 97 =

Class 97 may refer to:

- British Rail Class 97
- DRG Class 97, a class of German rack railway steam locomotive operated by the Deutsche Reichsbahn
