= Nantucket Central Railroad Company =

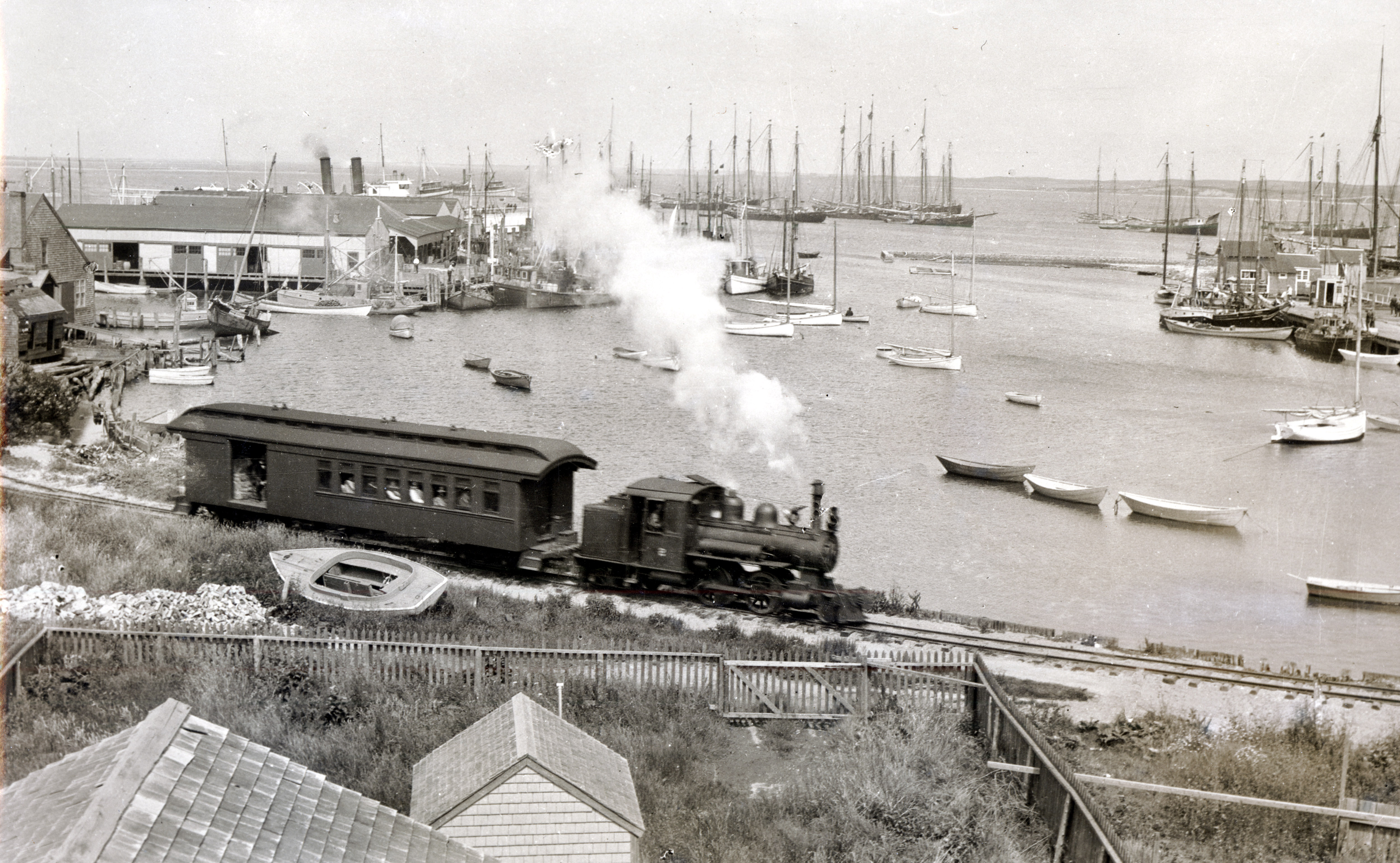
- Engine 2, with Nantucket Harbor behind it

Overview
- Headquarters: Siasconset
- Locale: Massachusetts
- Dates of operation: 1881–1917
- Successor: Abandoned

Technical
- Track gauge: 3 ft (914 mm)
- Length: 9 miles (14 km)

The Nantucket Central Railroad Company was a 3 ft (914 mm) narrow gauge railroad on the island of Nantucket. The railroad linked the village of Nantucket with the village of Siasconset. Built in 1881, the line closed in 1917, with the track and rolling stock sent to France as part of the Allied forces of the First World War. Years after the railroad was discontinued, the last railroad car left on the island was converted to a popular restaurant known today as the Club Car.

Originally, the company was known as the Nantucket Railroad, but following the bankruptcy of the company in 1895 allowed for the company to reorganize under the name that it carried until 1917.

== Locomotives ==
Number	Name	Builder	Type	Date	Works number	Notes
	Dionis	Baldwin Locomotive Works	4-4-0 tender			Originally built for the Danville, Olney and Ohio River Railroad; scrapped 1901
	Sconset	Mason Machine Works	0-4-4			Purchased from Boston, Revere Beach & Lynn Railroad 1888
1		Hinkley Locomotive Works	4-4-0 tender			Originally built 1879 for the Profile and Franconia Notch Railroad as their #2 "Profile" by Hinkley Locomotive Works - Boston, b/n 1285; thence sold to Boston, Revere Beach & Lynn Railroad; purchased 1901
2		Alco	2-4-4	1910		Sent to the Allied Expeditionary Force, Bordeaux, France in 1917
	Siasconset	Fairbanks-Morse Company	4wPM	1907		Early gasoline-powered railcar capable of carrying ten passengers
