= DRG Class 97 =

DRG Class 97 is a class of German rack railway steam locomotive operated by the Deutsche Reichsbahn comprising:

- Class 97.0: Prussian T 26
- Class 97.1: Bavarian PtzL 3/4
- Class 97.2: Baden IX b
- Class 97.2^{II}: kkStB 69
- Class 97.3: Württemberg Fz
- Class 97.3^{II}: kkStB 269
- Class 97.4: Prussian T 28
- Class 97.4^{II}: BBÖ 369, later ÖBB 297
- Class 97.5: Württemberg Hz
- Class 97.6: kkStB 169
