= Bavarian D XII =

Bavarian D XII, Pt 2/5 N P 2.II (Palatinate) DRG Class 73.0–1
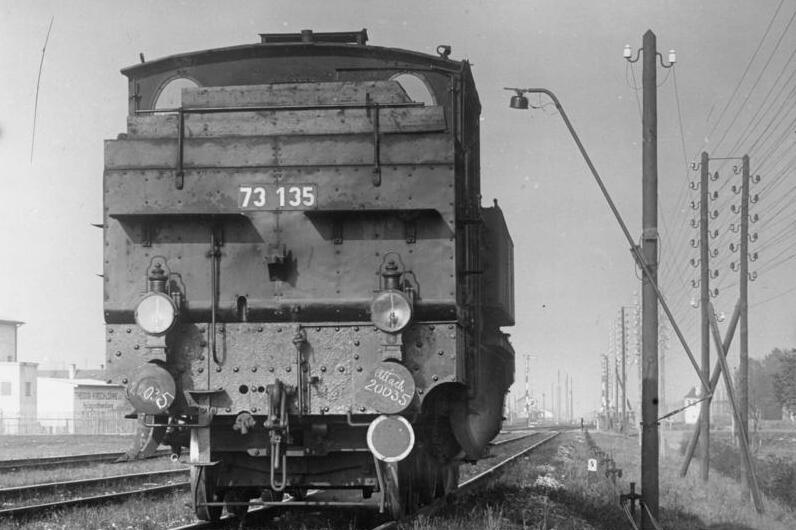
Type and origin
- Builder: Krauss (Munich); Maffei; SACM (Grafenstaden)
- Build date: 1897–1912
- Total produced: D XII: 96; P2.II: 31; Pt 2/5 N: 9; AL D33/T7/T5: 37; Total: 174
Specifications
- Configuration
  - Whyte: 2-4-4T
- Gauge: 1,435 mm (4 ft 8 1/2 in)
- Leading dia.: 1,006 mm (3 ft 3 5/8 in)
- Driver dia.: 1,640 mm (5 ft 4 5/8 in)
- Trailing dia.: 1,006 mm (3 ft 3 5/8 in)
- Length
  - Over beams: 11,850 or 11,928 mm (38 ft 10 1/2 in or 39 ft 1 1/2 in)
- Axle load: 14.6 or 15.0 t (14.4 or 14.8 long tons; 16.1 or 16.5 short tons)
- Adhesive weight: 28.8 or 30.0 t (28.3 or 29.5 long tons; 31.7 or 33.1 short tons)
- Service weight: 68.8 or 67.5 t (67.7 or 66.4 long tons; 75.8 or 74.4 short tons)
- Boiler pressure: 12 or 13 kgf/cm^{2} (1,180 or 1,270 kPa; 171 or 185 lbf/in^{2})
- Heating surface
  - Firebox: 1.96 m^{2} (21.1 sq ft)
  - Evaporative: 104.63 m^{2} (1,126.2 sq ft)
- Cylinders: Two
- Cylinder size: 450 mm (17 11/16 in)
- Piston stroke: 560 mm (22 1/16 in)
Performance figures
- Maximum speed: 90 km/h (56 mph)
Career
- Numbers: K.Bay.Sts.B.; D XII: 2201–2296; Pt 2/5 N: 5205–5210, Pfalzbahn: 88(2nd)…95(2nd), 260–262, 264–284; Saar Railways: 6601–6605; DRG: P2.II: 73 001 – 73 028; D XII: 73 031 – 73 125; Pt 2/5 N: 73 131 – 73 139
- Retired: 1948

The Bavarian Class D XII steam locomotives were manufactured by the firm of Krauss from 1897 for the Royal Bavarian State Railways (Königlich Bayerische Staatsbahn). Ninety six of them were procured for service on the stub lines running from Munich into the mountains, but in reality they were stationed in many large Bavarian locomotive depots (Bahnbetriebswerke or Bw). Two engines were transferred to the Palatinate Railway (Pfalzbahn) in 1916, the remaining 94 later joined the Deutsche Reichsbahn fleet and were incorporated as DRG Class 73.0-1 with operating numbers 73 031–124.

The Palatinate Railway procured the almost identical Palatine P 2.II class in 31 examples during the years 1900 to 1903. 28 engines were taken over as 73 001–028 by the Deutsche Reichsbahn, the remaining three were handed over to the Saar Railway (Saarbahn).

Between 1903 and 1912, 37 engines went to the Imperial Railways in Alsace-Lorraine (Reichseisenbahnen in Elsaß-Lothringen) and were given the numbers T 5 6601–6637. One of these vehicles was taken over by the Deutsche Reichsbahn under operating number 73 125.

The Bavarian Pt 2/5 H built in 1906 as a one-off, had shown that the use of a superheater brought no clear gains due to the low coupled axle load. As a result, in 1907 nine similar machines with saturated steam operation were built, as the Bavarian Pt 2/5 N class. These engines were incorporated into the Deutsche Reichsbahn as numbers 73 131 to 73 139.

Most of the locomotives were retired by 1925; but several examples were still in the vehicle park until 1948.

== See also ==
- Royal Bavarian State Railways
- List of Bavarian locomotives and railbuses
