= 0-8-6T =

Locomotive wheel arrangement

An 0-8-6, in the Whyte notation for the classification of steam locomotives by wheel arrangement, is a locomotive with no leading wheels, eight driving wheels (4 axles) fixed in a rigid frame, and six trailing wheels (normally mounted in a trailing truck). All locomotives using this wheel arrangement were tank locomotives.

Examples of this type of locomotive were built by Wilhelm von Engerth.

== Equivalent classification ==
Other equivalent classifications are:

- UIC classification: D3 (also known as German classification and Italian classification)
- French classification: 043
