= OKf100 =

PKP class OKf100
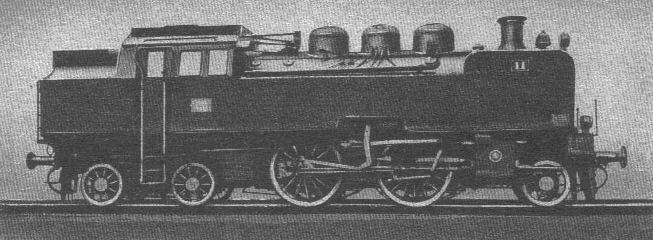
- View of the locomotive in Lithuania
Type and origin
- Power type: Steam
- Builder: Škoda Works
- Build date: 1932
- Total produced: 4
Specifications
- Configuration
  - Whyte: 2-4-4T
- Gauge: 1,524 mm (5 ft); 1,435 mm (4 ft 8 1/2 in)
- Driver dia.: 1,600 mm (5.2 ft)
- Boiler: 14 at
- Cylinders: Two, outside
- Cylinder size: 500 mm (20 in)
- Loco brake: Knorr
Performance figures
- Maximum speed: 90 km/h (56 mph)
Career
- Operators: Lithuanian Railways; Polish State Railways
- Number in class: 1 (PKP)
- Numbers: 11-14 (Lithuanian Railways)
- Retired: 1950

The OKf100 class locomotive was a Czechoslovak-built passenger steam locomotive, formerly part of the Lithuanian Tk class, used by the Polish State Railways. After 1945, one member of the Tk class ended up in Poland and was classified as the solitary member of the OKf100 class.

The locomotive belonged to the Lithuanian Tk class passenger tank locomotives, consisting of four members, manufactured in 1932 by Škoda Works of Czechoslovakia, bearing numbers 11 to 14. These locomotives originally ran on standard gauge tracks, but after Lithuania was annexed by the USSR in 1940, they were converted to run on broad-gauge tracks. During World War II, they found themselves in Austria, again converted into standard gauge.

Number 14 (works number 754) of the class was delivered to Poland, being temporally numbered as PK 14 for unknown reasons. During World War II, the locomotive was stationed at the Škirotava engine house in Latvia, and then in Vienna-Hütteldorf in Austria. The locomotive arrived in Poland on November 15, 1948, mistakenly listed as being designated class TKp14 of the Polish railways. It entered PKP stock, became classified as OKf100-1 and was sent for repair to the Wrocław-Nadodrze workshops—but repairs never happened and it was derostered in 1950. Its boiler was used for heating purposes in Wrocław until 1975.

The locomotive had two outside cylinders, with its front axle on a Bissel semi-truck. The locomotive was fitted with Knorr system brakes. The linked axles and the Krauss-Helmholtz two-axle rear bogie are also fitted with brakes. Fitted on the boiler is the steam dome, the sandbox and a third dome to purify the feed water.

== Bibliography ==
- Herman Gijsbert Hesselink, Norbert Tempel: Eisenbahnen im Baltikum, Münster, 1996, ISBN 3921980518.
- Tomasz Roszak: Parowozy Litwy i Łotwy w służbie PKP, „Świat Kolei” nr 3/2002(080), s. 11–12
