= Thuile locomotive =

1899 steam locomotive

Thuile
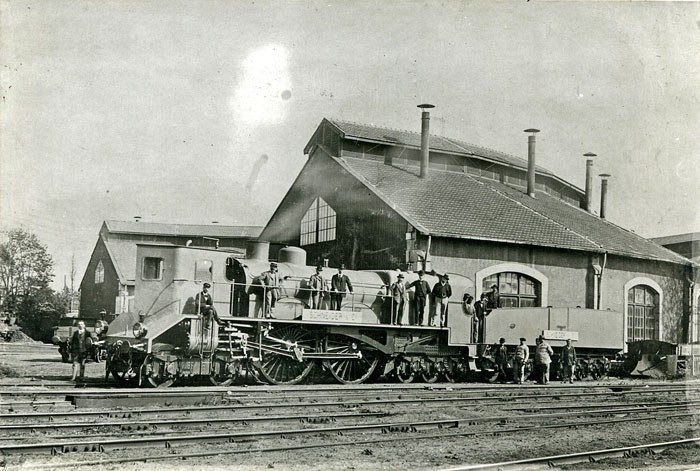
- Thuile locomotive at Chartres, 1900
Type and origin
- Power type: Steam
- Designer: Thuile
- Builder: Schneider
- Build date: 1899
Specifications
- Configuration
  - Whyte: 4-4-6
  - UIC: 2'B3'
- Gauge: 1,435 mm (4 ft 8 1/2 in)
- Leading dia.: 1.06 m (3 ft 6 in)
- Driver dia.: 2.5 m (8 ft 2 in)
- Trailing dia.: 1.06 m (3 ft 6 in)
- Wheelbase: 12.25 m (40 ft 2 in)
- Length: 24.80 m (81 ft 4 in) (locomotive and tender)
- Loco weight: 80.60 t (79 long tons)
- Firebox
  - Grate area: 4.68 m^{2} (50 sq ft)
- Boiler pressure: 15 kg/cm^{2} (213 psi)
- Heating surface: 297.70 m^{2} (3,204 sq ft)
- Cylinders: 2
- Cylinder size: 510 mm × 700 mm (20 in × 28 in)
Performance figures
- Maximum speed: 117 km/h (73 mph)
Career
- Operators: Chemin de Fer de l'Etat
- Scrapped: 1904 (locomotive), post 1946 (tender)

The Thuile locomotive was a steam locomotive designed by M. Henri Thuile, of Alexandria, Egypt, and built in 1899.

== History ==
Thuile proposed a 6-4-8 or 6-4-6 locomotive with 3-metre-diameter (9 ft 10 in) driving wheels, but it was not built.

The design was taken up by Schneider, of Le Creusot, who built a 4-4-6 with 2.5-metre-diameter (8 ft 2 in) driving wheels, and a forward cab for the driver. The two-cylinder locomotive had Walschaerts valve gear and a double-lobed boiler of nickel-steel. The locomotive was exhibited at the International Exposition in Paris in 1900, and the trials were undertaken on the Chemin de Fer de l'Etat line between Chartres and Thouars. A speed of 117 kilometres per hour (73 mph) was attained hauling a load of 186 tonnes (183 long tons).

The trials ended when Thuile was killed in June 1900, apparently because he leant too far out of the locomotive and hit a lineside pole or a piece of scaffolding supporting an overbridge. The locomotive was returned to Schneider and was scrapped in 1904. The tender survived until at least 1946, when it was noted at Saint Pierre-des-Corps.
