= 0-12-0 =

Locomotive wheel arrangement

Under the Whyte notation for the classification of steam locomotives, 0-12-0 represents the wheel arrangement of no leading wheels, twelve powered and coupled driving wheels on six axles, and no trailing wheels.

== Equivalent classifications ==
Other equivalent classifications are:

- UIC classification: F (also known as German classification and Italian classification)
- French classification: 060
- Turkish classification: 66
- Swiss classification: 6/6

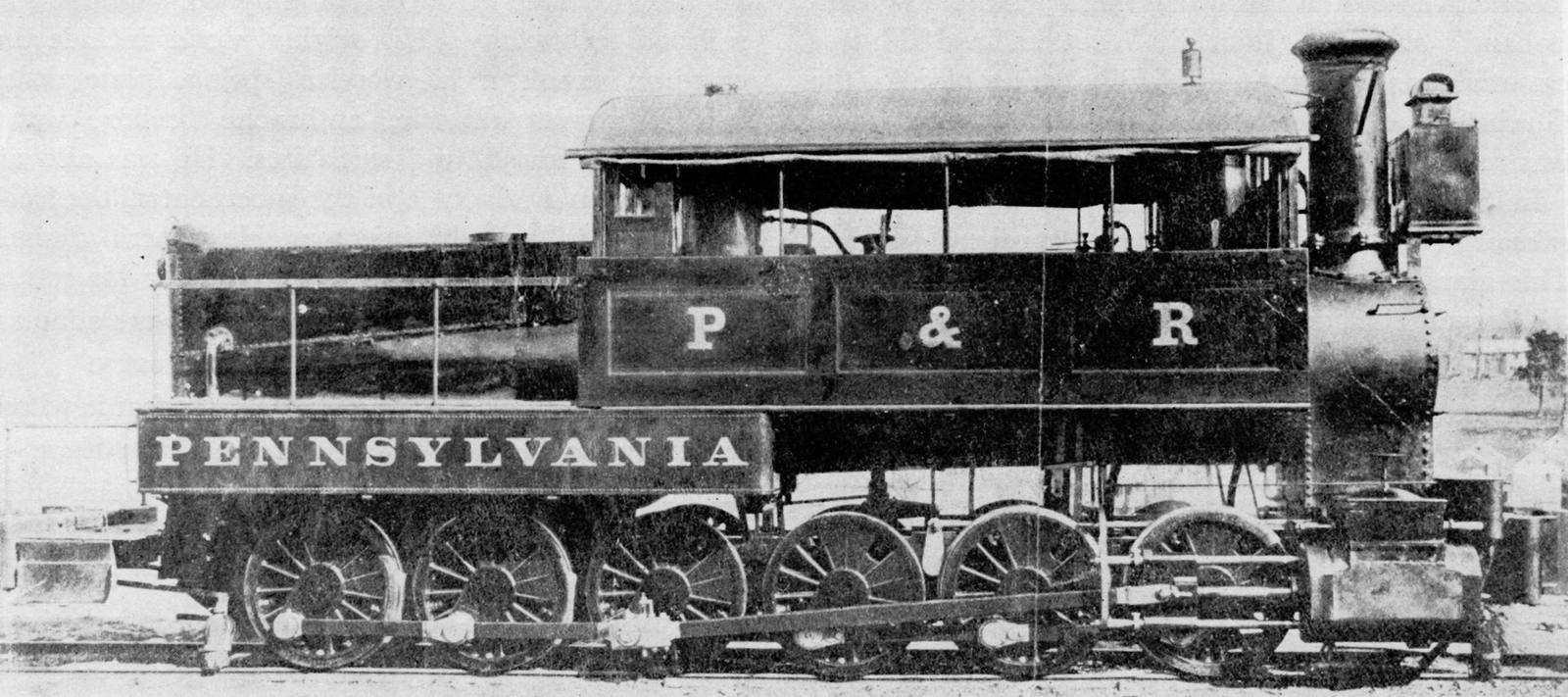
Pennsylvania

The first example of the 0-12-0 was the Pennsylvania, designed by Jame Milholland for the Philadelphia and Reading Railroad and built at its own shops in 1863. It weighed fifty tons and was, at the time, the heaviest steam locomotive in the world. It was intended as a pusher engine for Pennsylvania coal trains on the Falls Grades near Philadelphia.

== Tank engines ==
There were only two classes of 0-12-0T locomotives:

The first was a class of three rack locomotives built by Lokomotivfabrik Floridsdorf in 1912 for use on the Erzberg Railway (Erzbergbahn) in Austria. Initially classified as class 269 by the kkStB, they passed to the BBÖ after World War I, the Deutsche Reichsbahn in 1939, and finally the ÖBB after World War II. They all stayed in service until the 1970s.

The only others of the type, was a class of ten 0-12-0T locomotives built by Hanomag in 1922 for the Bulgarian State Railways (BDŽ). They were initially numbered 4001–4010, but were renumbered 45.01 to 45.10 in 1935–1936. They were built as two-cylinder compound locomotives, with a 15-kilogram-per-square-centimetre (1.47 MPa; 213 psi) boiler feeding a 620-by-700-millimetre (24.41 in × 27.56 in) high-pressure cylinder discharging to a 900-by-700-millimetre (35.43 in × 27.56 in), both of which were connected to the 1,340-millimetre (52.76 in) driving wheels. The locomotives weighed 101 tonnes (99 long tons; 111 short tons).

== Bibliography ==
- Durrant, A. E. (1972). The Steam Locomotives of Eastern Europe. Newton Abbot, Devon: David and Charles. ISBN 0-7153-4077-8.
- Ellis, C. Hamilton (1968). Pictorial encyclopaedia of railways. London: Hamlyn. ISBN 0-600-37585-4.
- White, John H. Jr. (1972). Early Locomotives. New York: Dover. ISBN 0-486-22772-3.
