= Danville, Olney and Ohio River Railroad =

Map

The 3 ft (914 mm) narrow gauge Danville, Olney and Ohio River Railroad ran south from Sidell to West Liberty, Illinois and existed in the late 19th century.

== History ==
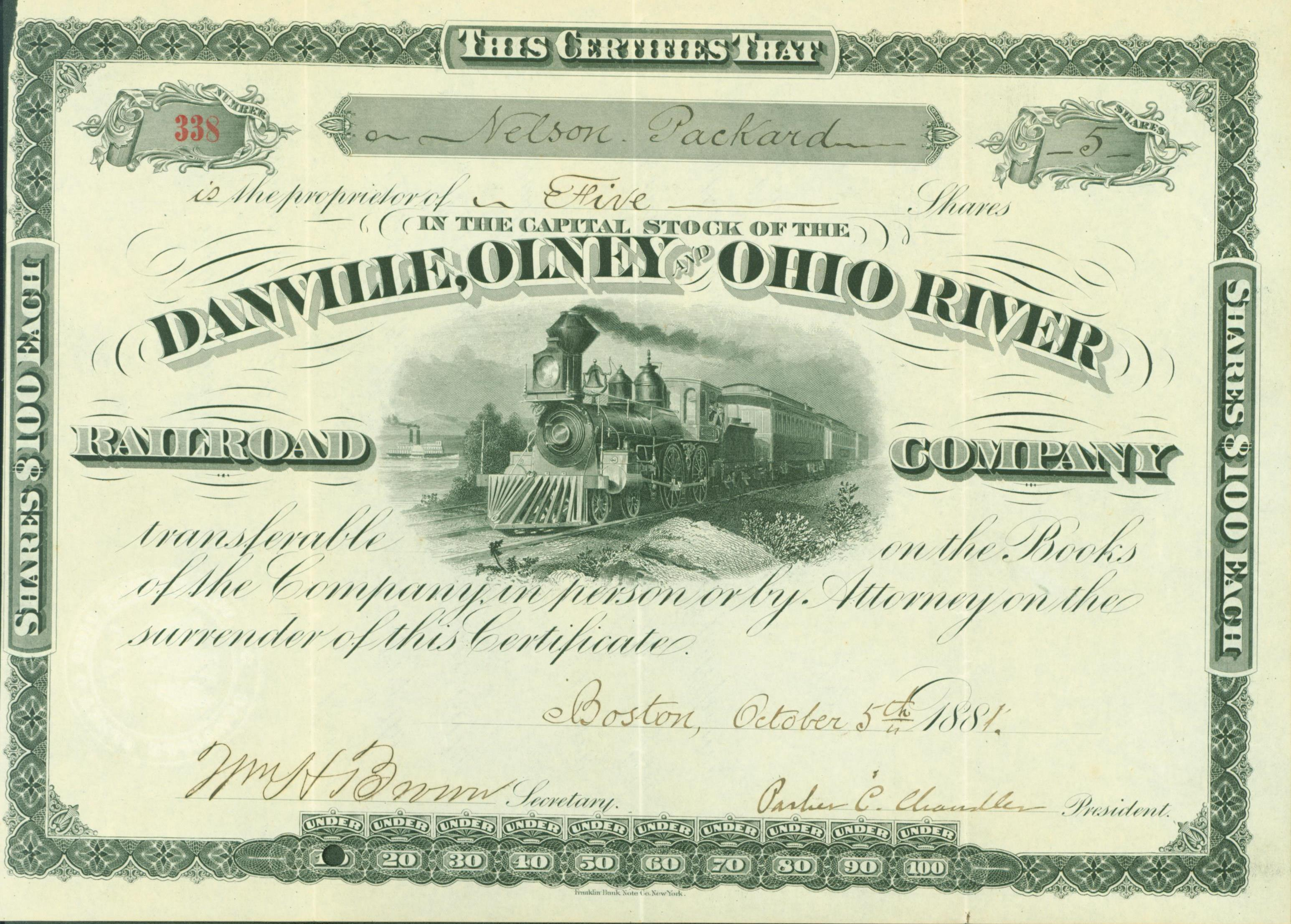
Share of the Danville, Olney and Ohio River Railroad Company, issued 5. October 1881

The original proposal for the railroad was for a 243-mile (391 km) route from Danville through Hume to the Ohio River. The portion running through Hume was completed and put into service in 1881.

The north–south railroad was known by the following official and unofficial names:

- Kansas and Sidell
- K & S
- Old Dody
- Dog River
- Crab Oyster
- Chicago & Ohio River
- C & O

As the roadbed decayed, the line carried freight at just nine and a half miles per hour (15.3 km/h). Derailments were frequent nonetheless.

I.N. Coolley served as President of the railroad in its later years.

The rolling stock of the railroad consisted of one caboose and two locomotives, numbered 200 and 201, which were former switch engines purchased from the Chicago and Eastern Illinois Railroad. Cars were rented from major railroads.

In 1886, the company was sold at foreclosure and acquired by the Chicago and Ohio River Railroad, a predecessor of the Illinois Central Railroad. However, when that company's successor, the Peoria, Decatur and Evansville Railway, went bankrupt, the line was resold in 1898 to the Indiana, Decatur and Western Railway, a predecessor of the Cincinnati, Indianapolis and Western Railroad (acquired by the Baltimore and Ohio Railroad in 1927).

In 1938, the line was abandoned by legal means. The scrap iron was removed by Hyman Michaels.

George H. Culp of Montezuma, Indiana, wrote a poem, entitled "The Old Road Passes", which describes the "Old Dog River line."

== See also ==
- Nantucket Central Railroad Company
