= 4-4-6 =

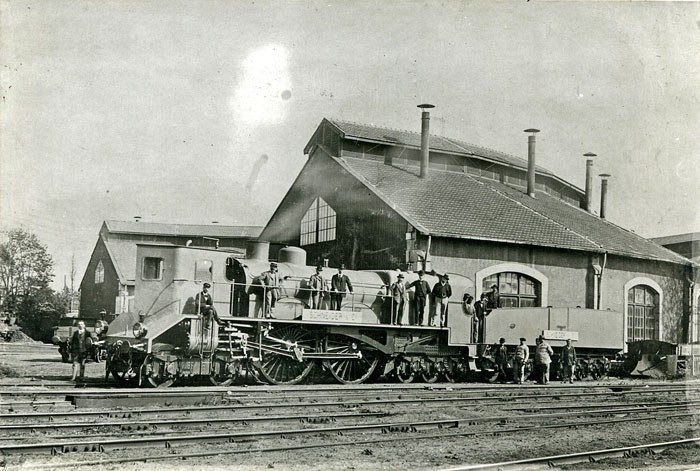
4-4-6 locomotive

A 4-4-6, in the Whyte notation for the classification of steam locomotives by wheel arrangement, is a locomotive with:

- four leading wheels (at the front of the locomotive)
- four driving wheels (2 axles) fixed in a rigid frame, and
- six trailing wheels (normally mounted in a trailing truck).

== Usage ==
=== United States ===
The Providence, Warren and Bristol Railroad's No. 4 Annawamscutt was the only example of a 4-4-6 in the United States. It was rebuilt into a 0-4-4T in 1891.

=== France ===
The only example of this wheel arrangement in France was the Thuile locomotive.

Other equivalent classifications are:

- UIC classification: 2′B3′ (also known as German classification
- Italian classification), and
- French classification: 223.
