= Boston, Revere Beach and Lynn Railroad =

Former narrow-gauge passenger railroad

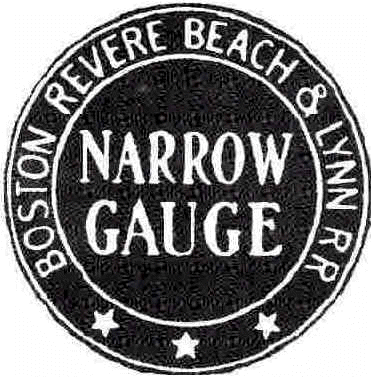

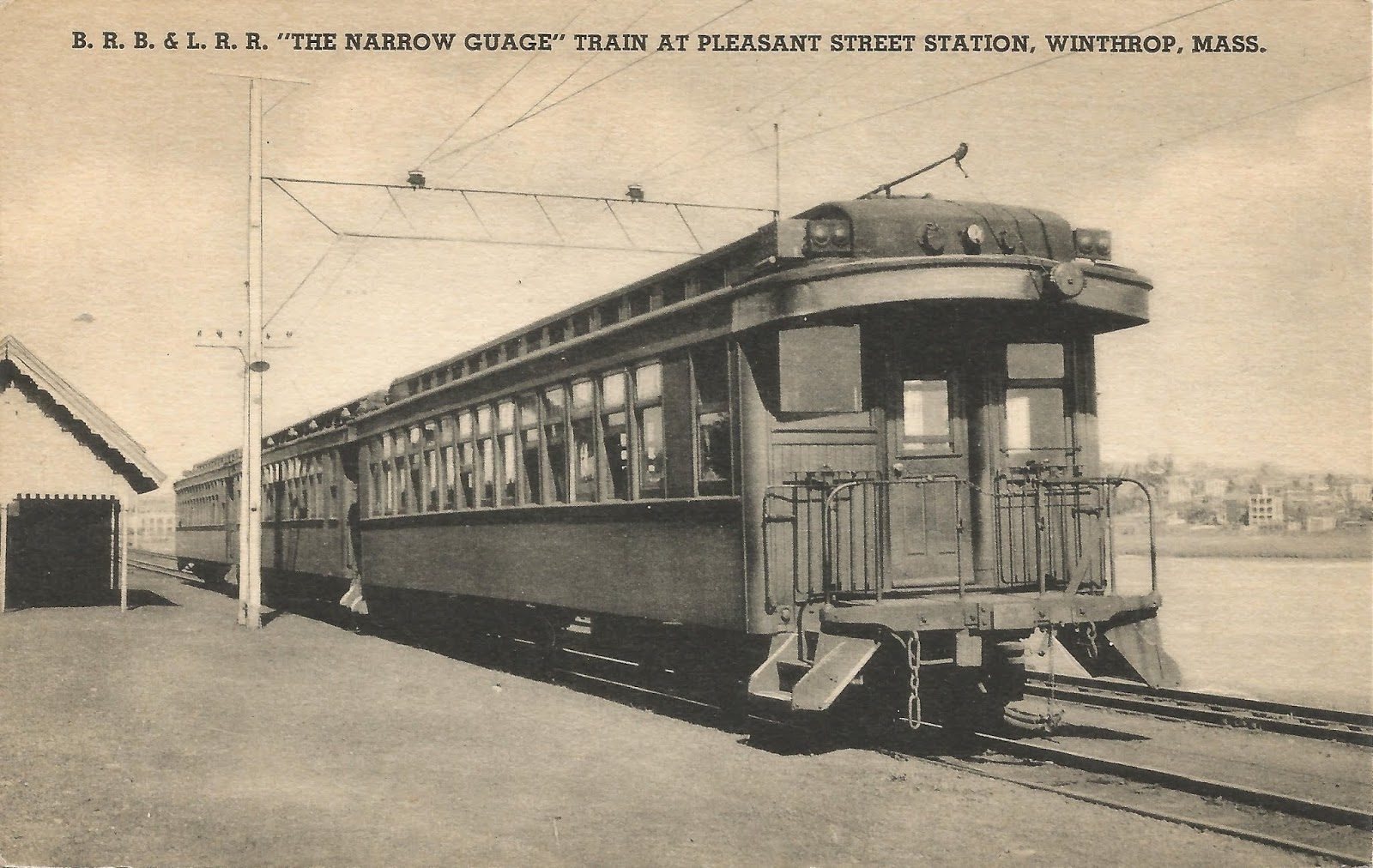
- A BRB&L train at Pleasant Street station

Overview
- Locale: North Shore, Massachusetts
- Dates of operation: 1875–1940

Technical
- Track gauge: 3 ft (914 mm)

The Boston, Revere Beach and Lynn Railroad was a 3 ft (914 mm) narrow-gauge passenger-carrying shortline railroad between East Boston and Lynn, Massachusetts, from 1875 to 1940. Part of the railroad's right of way now forms the outer section of the Massachusetts Bay Transportation Authority's Blue Line rapid transit service.

== History ==
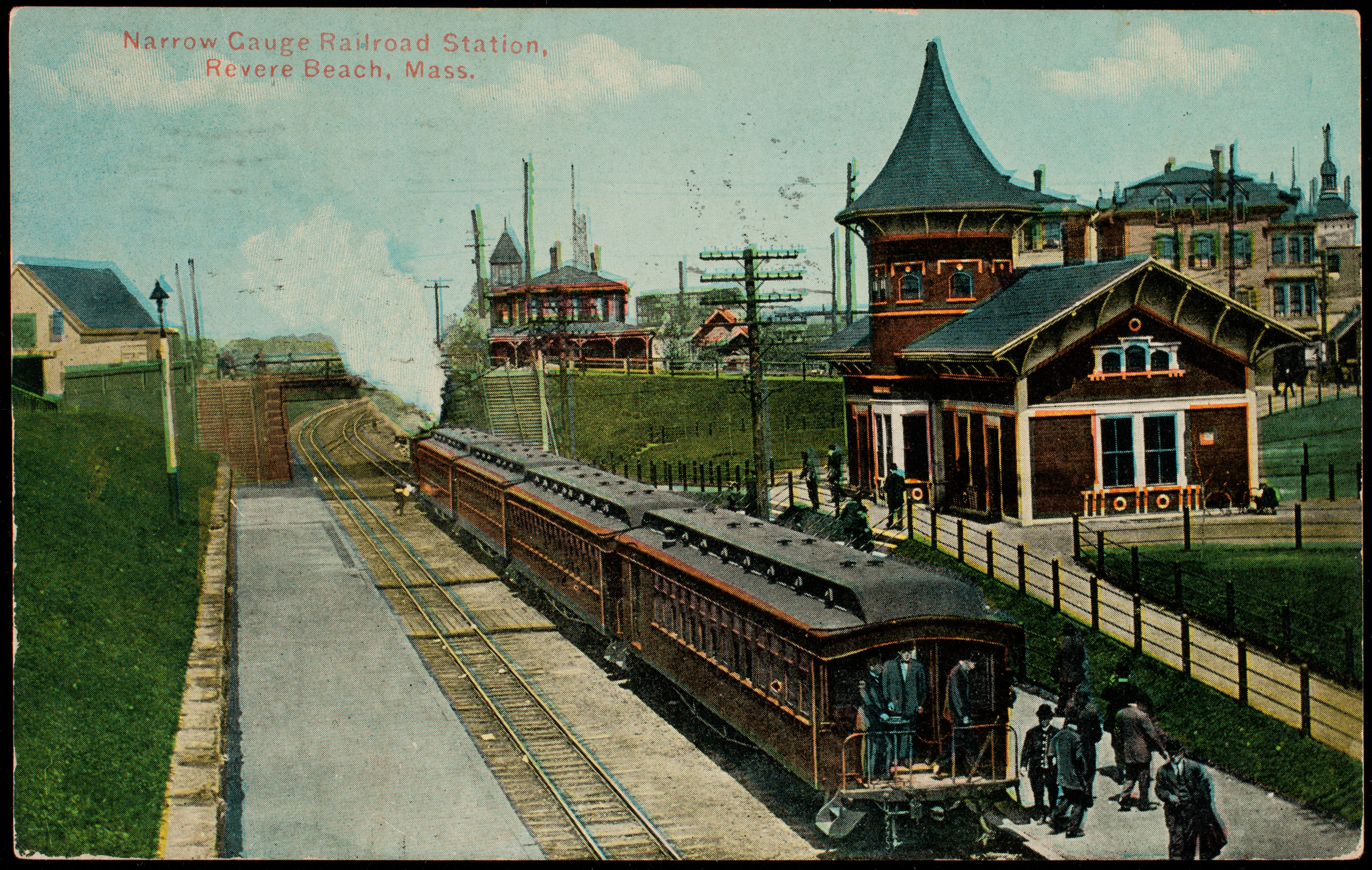
Crescent Beach station around 1910

The railroad was chartered May 23, 1874, and opened July 29, 1875. A ferry connection from its southern terminus at East Boston connected to Rowes Wharf in the city of Boston proper, with a connection to the Atlantic Avenue Elevated (from 1901 to 1938). The railroad followed the coastline north-eastward through the resort of Revere Beach to the far terminus at Lynn. A branch split at Orient Heights to a loop through Winthrop.

The rail laid was light, 30-pound per yard (15 kg/m) rail being installed at first, increased to 50 lb/yd (25 kg/m) in 1885 and 60 lb/yd (30 kg/m) in 1904. It was, however, laid from the beginning on standard gauge-sized ties. Given the lightweight rail, the locomotives were small and of 3 ft (914 mm) narrow gauge dimensions. The vast majority of them were Mason Bogies, 11 from the Mason Machine Works and a further 21 from other builders after Mason closed. Cars were of 3 ft (914 mm) narrow gauge dimensions, seating four across.

Between 1896 and 1900, the section from Revere Beach to Point of Pines, formerly running along the beach, was relocated inland to lie next to the Eastern Railroad's abandoned Chelsea Beach Branch. The stations were moved and a new one (Bath House) was built. Revere Beach Boulevard was built later along the former route.

Revere Beach became a very popular resort, and the entire line was double-tracked by 1903. The Narrow Gauge Hotel burned in 1902. The 1904 Independence Day celebration included a staged collision between two obsolete Boston and Maine locomotives, and the rowdy crowds caused the town to cancel the Pines Hotel liquor license. 1906 festivities included a large papier-mâché structure which would spew a cloud of souvenir post cards with smoke and flashing lights as the Eruption of Mount Vesuvius. Commodore Perry's flagship USS Saratoga was burned offshore as a tourist attraction in 1908. Theodore Roosevelt spoke from the Pines Hotel during his 1912 presidential campaign as a Bull Moose candidate. The Pines Hotel closed in 1913 after a police raid discovered unlicensed liquor sales. The Boston American flying exhibition of July 1914 attracted large crowds. Six passenger cars were purchased by the East Broad Top Railroad in 1916; three were sold again in 1942, while three remain in use.

The railroad was highly successful, carrying commuters into Boston and the Boston urban population to the seaside resorts. By 1914 over seven million passengers were carried annually, making it one of the most heavily traveled stretches of railroad in North America. With such a traffic density, the expense of electrification could be easily recouped. By 1928, all existing cars were fitted with electric motors, trolley poles, and control stands and the steam locomotives were disposed of. However, the number of riders decreased during the Great Depression and completion of the Sumner Tunnel between East Boston and downtown Boston in 1934 allowed automobiles to compete with the ferries.

After attempts to find a buyer fell through, the BRB&L filed for bankruptcy in 1937. A September 1938 hurricane destroyed 500 ft (150 m) of overhead wire and damaged the East Boston terminal. Further losses of ridership followed, and in 1939 the management petitioned for abandonment. After a railfan excursion train on 15 October the abandonment petition was granted, and the railroad ceased operations on January 27, 1940.

=== Winthrop sections ===
On July 1, 1891, the BRB&L merged with the 3 ft (914 mm) narrow gauge Boston, Winthrop and Shore Railroad. The BW&S was itself a consolidation on December 12, 1883 of the Boston, Winthrop and Point Shirley Railroad and Eastern Junction, Broad Sound Pier and Point Shirley Railroad.

==== Boston, Winthrop and Point Shirley Railroad ====
The BW&PS was organized on July 3, 1876 and opened a 3 ft (914 mm) narrow gauge line on June 7, 1877. This line split from the BRB&L at Winthrop Junction and headed east and south for 1.8 miles (2.9 km) to Winthrop Center and extended in stages during the following years. In 1881, the part heading south was closed and a new line was built east to Ocean Spray and south to Short Beach.

==== Eastern Junction, Broad Sound Pier and Point Shirley Railroad ====
The EJBSP&PS was chartered in 1880 and built a standard gauge railway line from the Eastern Railroad near Crescent Beach southeast via Beachmont and Winthrop Beach to Point Shirley. South of Ocean Spray, this was just east of the BW&PS. Much of this shared section of right-of-way used a three-rail, dual-gauge track. A branch of the EJBSP&PS was also constructed in Revere, from the junction with the Eastern Railroad north to Point of Pines, parallel with the Eastern's Chelsea Beach line. The EJBSP&PS was not operated until 1884, by which time it had been absorbed into the Boston, Winthrop & Shore RR. It operated for only two summers before being abandoned due to damage from storms.

==== Post-merger ====
The BW&PS and the EJBSP&PS, along with the Boston & Winthrop (a "paper railroad" proposed but never built) were merged late in 1883 and operated thereafter as the Boston, Winthrop & Shore RR. In 1885, after a storm, sections of line were abandoned, and the management of the BRB&L stepped in. A circuit or loop line was constructed in 1888 and existed until the 1940 demise of the BRB&L. It used parts of the original alignment of the BW&PS. Most of the line, however, was built brand new, serving Winthrop Highlands, Winthrop Center and Winthrop Beach. The loop was double-tracked in 1903.

==== Point Shirley Street Railway ====
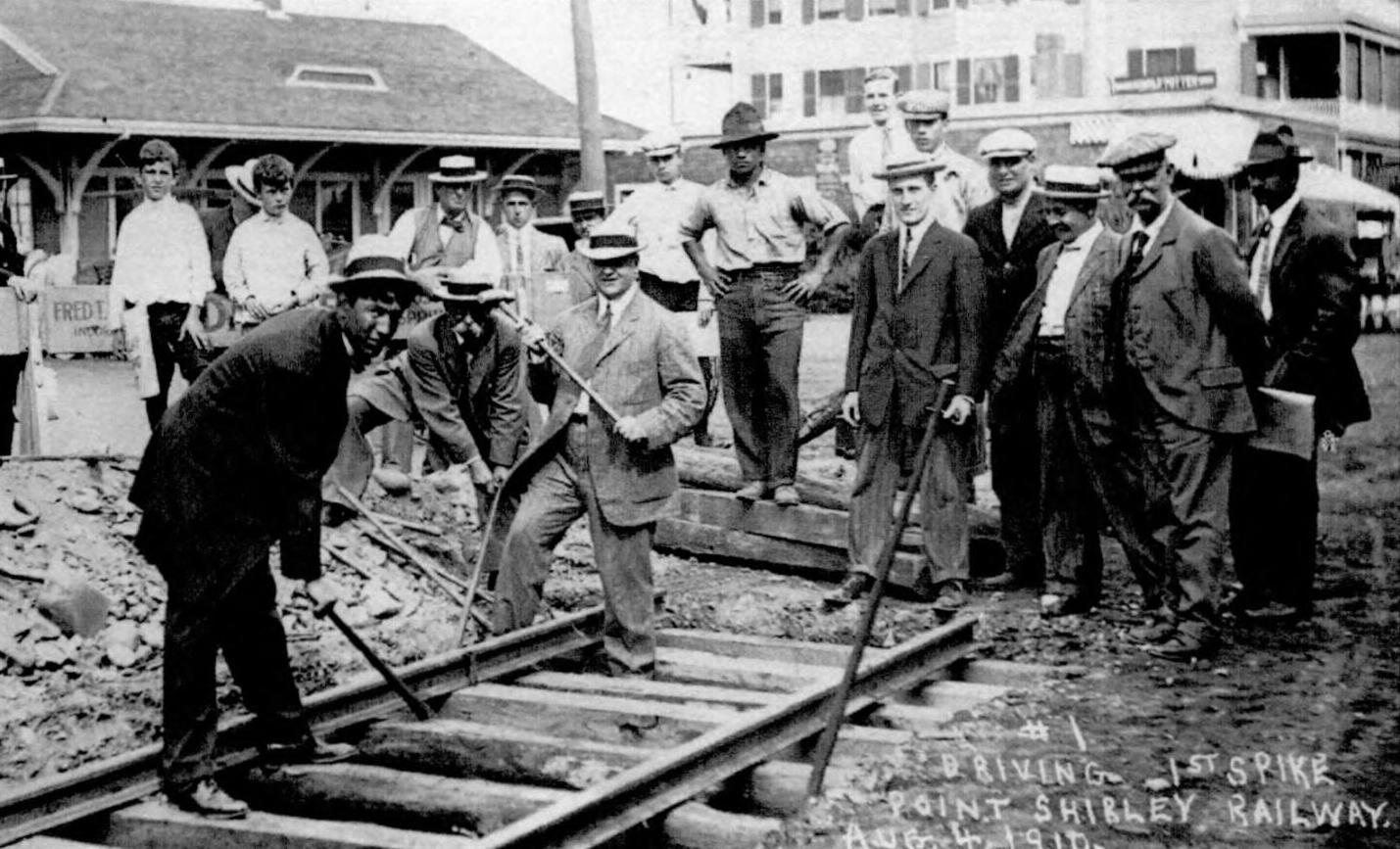
Ceremonial driving of the first spike on the line in August 1910

The Point Shirley Street Railway was built from Winthrop Beach station to Point Shirley beginning in August 1910 and opened later that year. The 1.2-mile (1.9 km) single-track line ran along Shirley Street and Tafts Avenue. The BRB&L acquired the entire line with legislative approval in October 1912. By 1914, the line operated 30,594 car miles (an average of 35 daily round trips), carried 165,037 passengers (an average of 452 daily), and employed seven people.

Unusually, the Point Shirley Street Railway did not operate with electric power from overhead lines. It first used a gasoline-powered electric streetcar, then a battery-powered streetcar owned by the BRB&L, but these did not prove adequate for reliable service and by early 1919 buses were used instead. This prompted a public outcry with demands for conventional overhead-powered cars; instead, the BRB&L introduced two lighter battery-powered streetcars with better performance to the line in May 1919.

Even the 1919-built cars proved to be too expensive to operate on a marginal low-traffic line. In 1928, they were permanently replaced by buses.

=== After closure ===
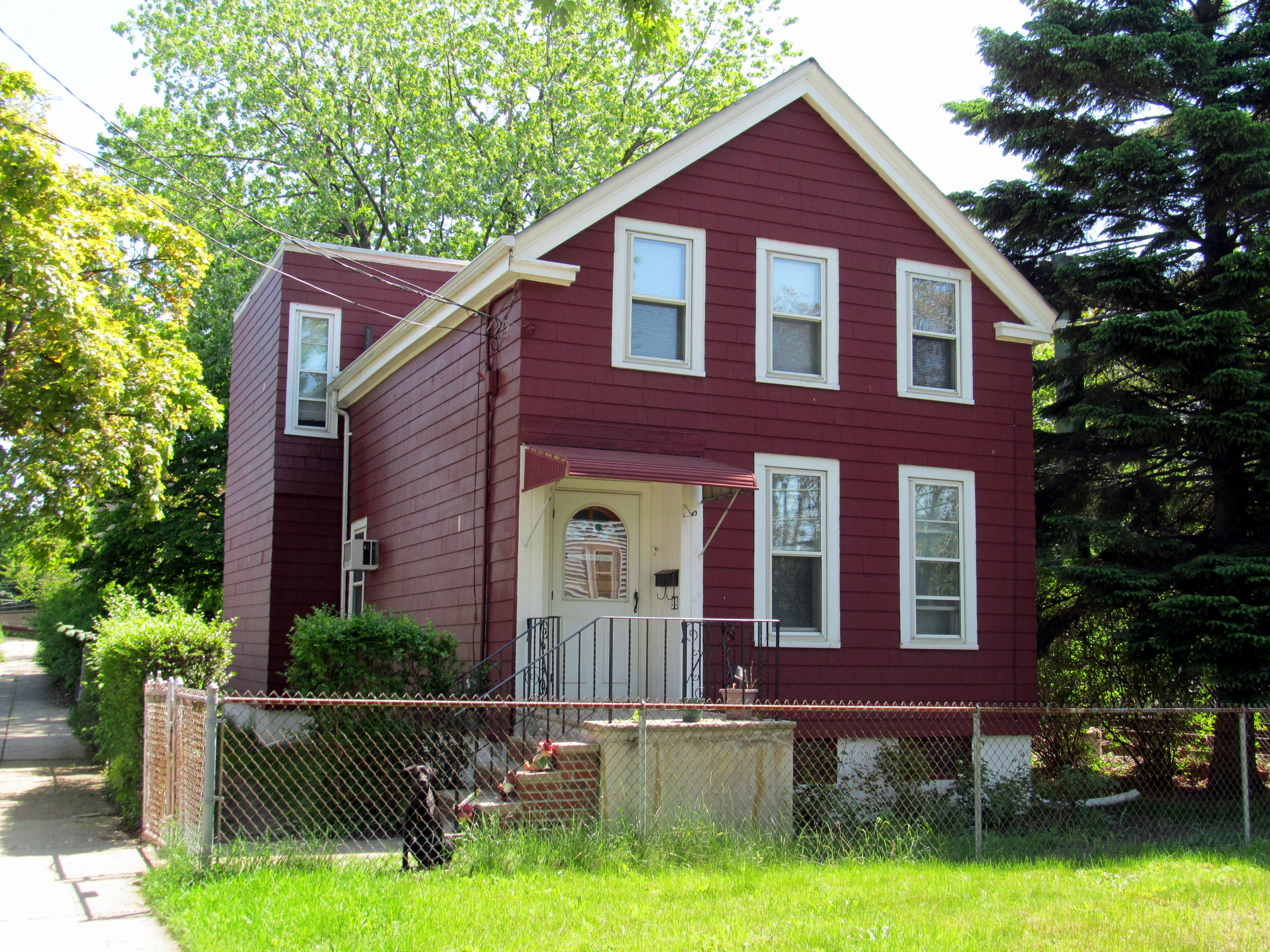
The former Harbor View station, now a private residence, in 2012

Worth $2 million immediately after electrification, the railroad was sold to a scrap dealer for $118,756. The tracks were removed and the catenary structures cut down for scrap value. The passenger cars failed to be sold at auction and were burnt in mid-1940 to retrieve their metal components. The motorized trucks were sold to the Eastern Mass. Most former stations were demolished shortly after abandonment or during rapid transit conversion. Thornton, moved and converted to a house when the line was double-tracked in 1903, is reportedly still extant. In addition, Harbor View, closed earlier than the rest of the line and moved slightly from its original location, remains as a private residence.

==== Bus service ====
Upon abandonment of the BRB&L, Lynn–Boston passengers were served by existing Eastern Massachusetts Street Railway (Eastern Mass) bus service and Boston and Maine Railroad rail service. Revere–Boston passengers were served by Boston Elevated Railway (BERy) streetcars connecting to the East Boston Tunnel; the company also operated a Revere Beach–Point of Pines bus service for two months. Winthrop–Boston bus service was operated by Saugus Transit (later Rapid Transit Inc.). Saugus Transit initially operated Winthrop–Lynn bus service under a temporary permit. On April 2, 1940, this service was split in two with a forced transfer at Point of Pines: Revere-based Service Bus Lines continued to operate Winthrop–Point of Pines, while the Lynn-based Eastern Mass operated Lynn–Point of Pines as part of a new Lynn–Boston route.

In January 1941, the Eastern Mass bought the Lynn terminal and a section of right of way for use as a busway. After the Eastern Mass relocated its bus terminal to Central Square, the company no longer needed the land and it was fragmented into commercial properties.

==== Blue Line ====
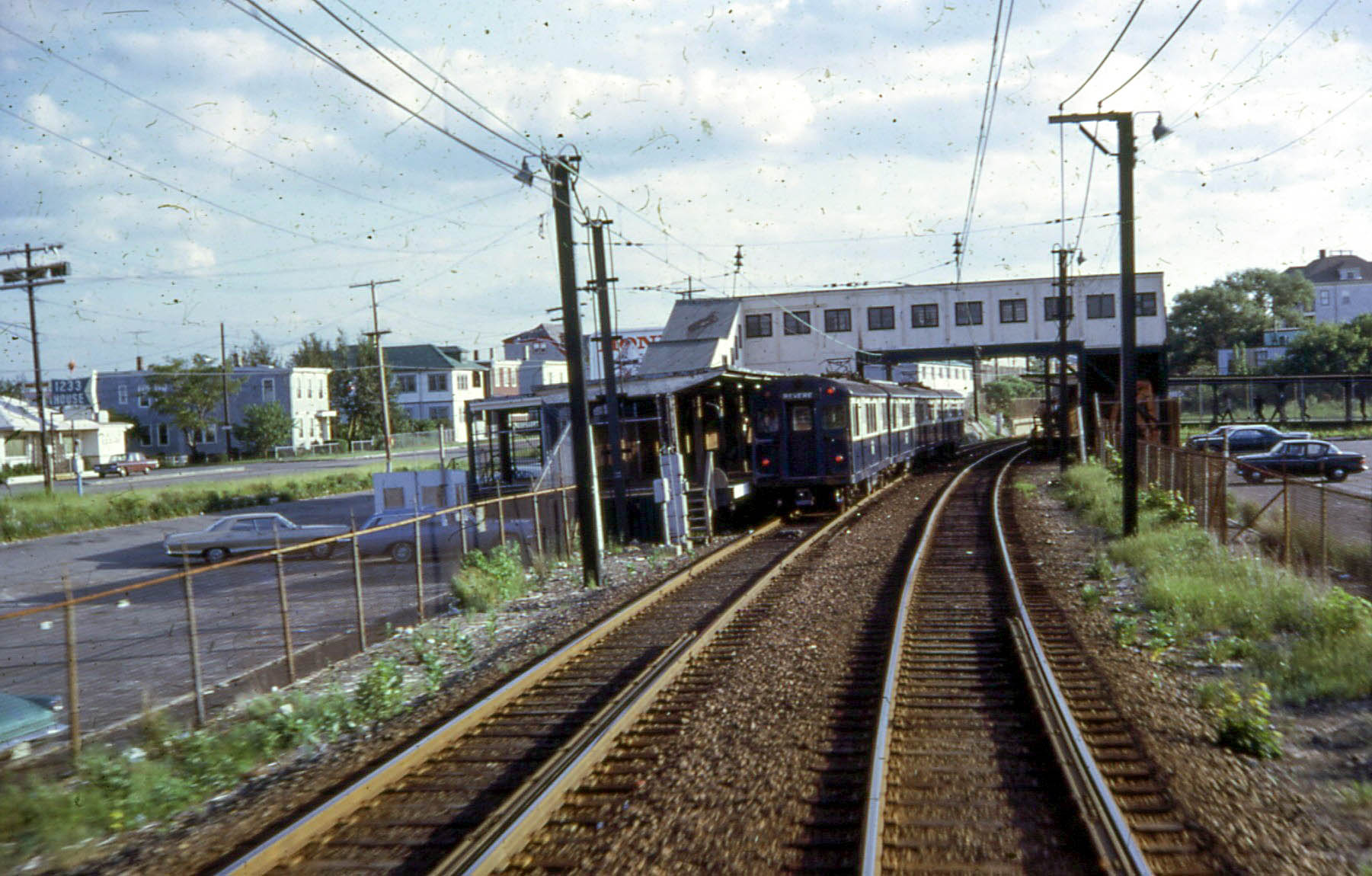
A Blue Line train on the former BRB&L right of way at Suffolk Downs in 1967

In 1941, the BERy bought the BRB&L right of way from Day Square to Revere Beach for use as a high-speed trolley line similar to the Ashmont–Mattapan High-Speed Line; these plans were delayed by the onset of World War II. However, the 1926 Report on Improved Transportation Facilities and 1945–47 Coolidge Commission Report recommended that the East Boston Tunnel line, which had been converted to rapid transit from streetcars in 1924, be extended to Lynn via the BBRB&L route rather than using it for a trolley line.

In 1947, the newly formed Metropolitan Transit Authority (M.T.A.) decided to build to Lynn as a rapid transit line, and construction began in October 1948. The first part of the Revere Extension opened to Orient Heights on January 5, 1952, with intermediate stations at Airport and Day Square, and to Suffolk Downs on April 21, 1952. The second phase (cut short due to limited funds, and possibly due to the Eastern Massachusetts wielding its influence to protect its business in Lynn) opened to Wonderland on January 19, 1954 with intermediate stations at Beachmont and Revere Beach. All stations from Orient Heights to Wonderland were located at the sites of former BRB&L stations. The line was renamed as the Blue Line in 1965.

Although recommended and studied several times since, further Blue Line extension to Lynn has not moved past the proposal stage. The former right of way from Revere Street to Point of Pines is owned by the Massachusetts Electric Company, a National Grid subsidiary, and used as a utility corridor. Most of its length is covered in brush or wetlands, although several residential buildings and parking areas incur on the utility-owned right of way in Point of Pines. The Alternatives Analysis / Draft Environmental Impact Statement, released in 2011, considered two potential routes: one following the Narrow Gauge right of way through Point of Pines, and one sharing the Newburyport/Rockport Line right of way.

==== Winthrop ====
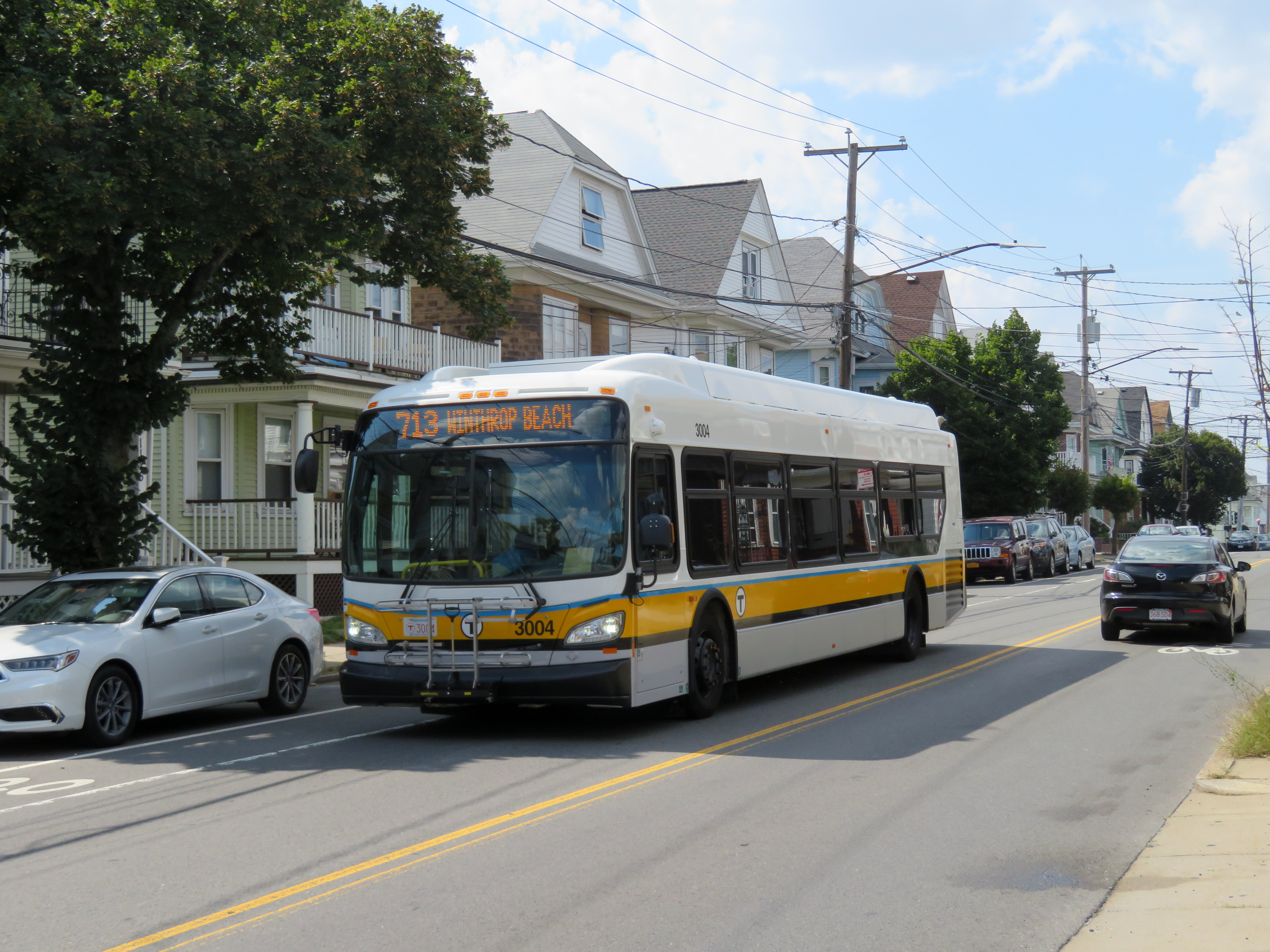
A route 713 bus in Orient Heights in 2018

The Winthrop Loop was not preserved for transit use; some stations were destroyed within weeks. Much of the right of way is owned by the town, including the sections used for Veterans Road and Walden Street as well as a baseball field near Fort Banks and the embankment through Crystal Cove. Other sections were reused for housing and commercial developments; a short section near Argyle Street is a walking trail. During the 1990s, a short section of track was installed as a memorial to the line in Winthrop Center, and portions of the Crystal Cove embankment are still extant.

Unlike the main line, the Winthrop Loop was not paralleled by mainline railroads or Boston Elevated Railway (BERy) streetcar lines. The town of Winthrop rejected plans for BERy to provide bus service. Instead, Saugus Transit began operating Winthrop Beach - Maverick bus service as soon as the BRB&L was abandoned; it was granted a permanent operating certificate under the name Rapid Transit Inc in March. The two routes split at Winthrop Beach and roughly paralleled the two halves of the Loop; a connecting service also operated through to Point Shirley.

Veterans Road was paved on the former right-of-way after World War II. The inbound terminus was changed to 1952-opened Orient Heights in May 1956. The MBTA, formed in 1964 to subsidize suburban commuter rail operations, began funding bus services including the Winthop service in 1968.

In July 1991, Winthrop bus operations were transferred to Paul Revere Transportation. In September 1999, the two halves of the loop service were designated as 712 Winthrop - Orient Heights via Highlands and 713 Winthrop - Orient Heights via Center and added to MBTA maps and signage. Outbound route 712 trips are through-routed to inbound route 713 trips and vice versa; some service continues to operate to Point Shirley.

==== Other sections ====
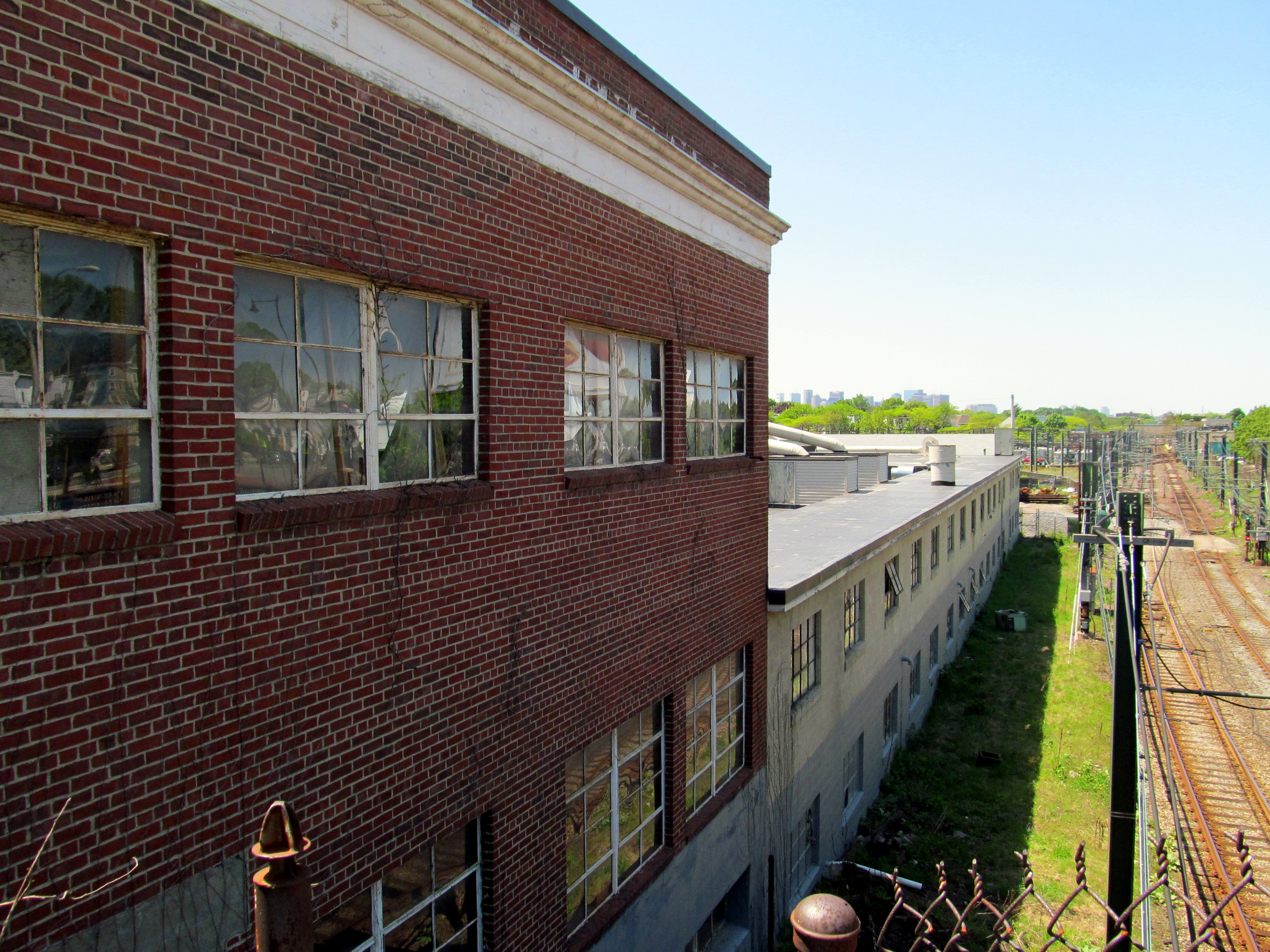
The former Orient Heights carhouse was a casket factory until a 2019 fire

The Orient Heights carhouse was repurposed as a casket factory. It was destroyed by a fire on March 15, 2019. The right of way from Byron Street to Tomahawk Drive was acquired by the Massachusetts Port Authority for the expansion of Logan Airport. The right of way through Jeffries Point is privately owned; the tunnels are intact, though their north ends are buried. Part of the right-of-way between Logan Airport and the Blue Line section was used for a U.S. Navy oil pipeline in the 1950s.

General Electric acquired most of the right of way through Lynn for expansion of the River Works plant during World War II, likely as settlement for debt still owed on the electrification project. GE later sold off its sections: one piece to a private developer in 1989, the piece near Commercial Street to the MBTA in 1991 (part of which was later sold to the same developer), and the western section to a different developer in 2014. New England Power Company (also a National Grid subsidiary) maintains an easement through the western section for electrical transmission lines.

== Station listing ==
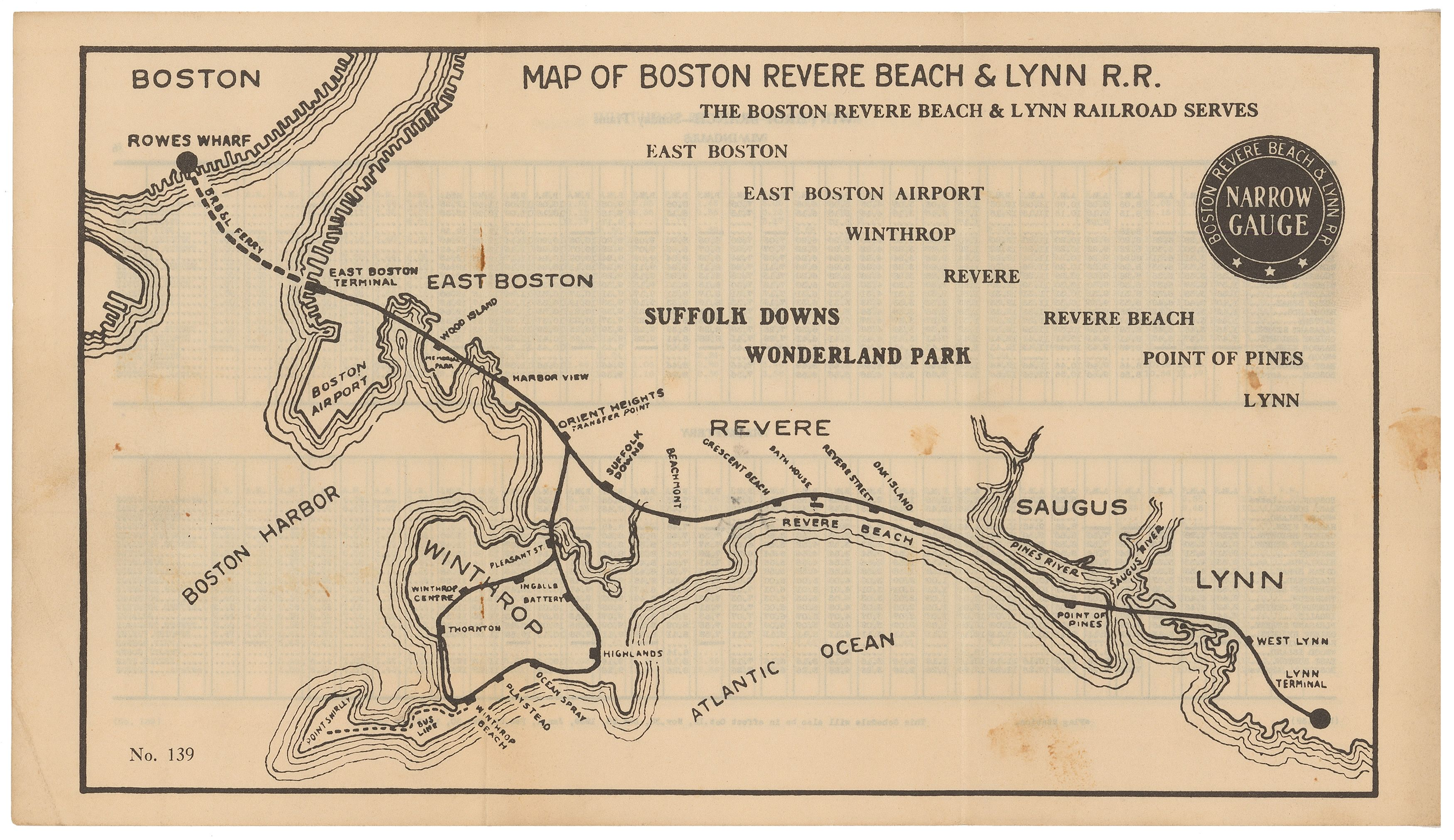
1939 map of the BRB&L

=== Winthrop Loop ===
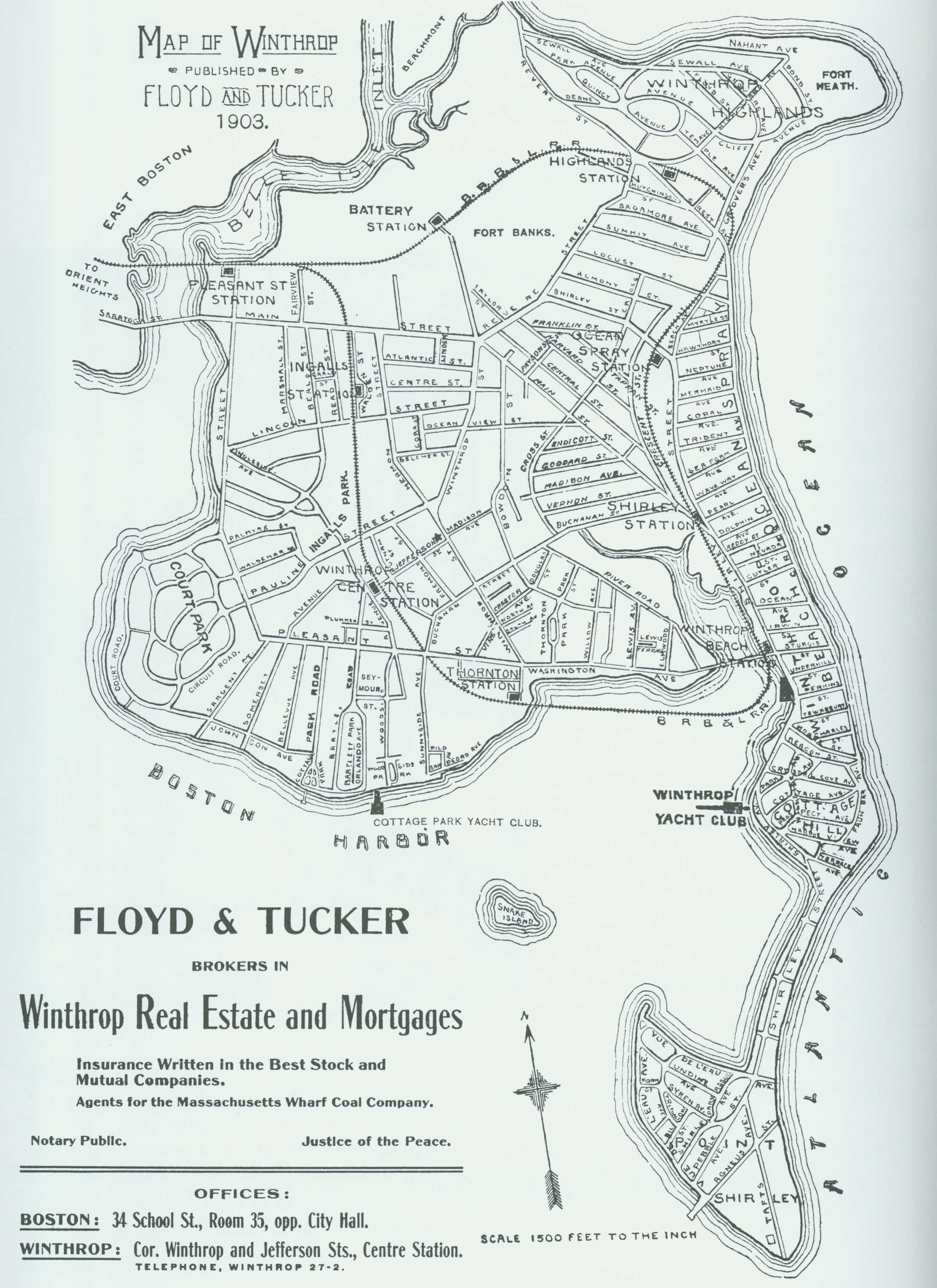
A 1903 map of Winthrop from Floyd and Tucker showing the route of the Winthrop Loop and station locations of the Boston Revere Beach and Lynn Railroad

This is going clockwise around the loop. The loop tracks split from the main line just north of Orient Heights, turned east and then split with one direction heading east and the other south. Much of the rail's path was converted to roads when the line was removed, but you can still see some of the existing railbed that curved out into Crystal Cove at Winthrop Beach Station, and the remnants of the rail bridges as it crossed Belle Isle March to connect at Orient Heights. Today, one can drive along Veteran's Road (current path of the old line) to experience the course of the commuter train as it ran parallel to Shirley Street. The location of the various railway stations in Winthrop had a tremendous influence on the pattern of Winthrop's suburban growth; business and commerce grew up naturally around these stations and ultimately into what would become today's neighborhoods.

Station	Notes
Pleasant Street	This station was located at the very north end of Pleasant Street as it meets Belle Isle Terrace, on the site of what is now part of a boat storage yard.
Battery	Station, originally Cherry St. Station, was located at the intersection of Banks Street and Wilshire Street, on the site of what is now a gravel parking lot for a warehouse.
Highlands	Station was located at the current location of Crest Avenue Playground; the depot was approximately where the jungle gym is today.
Ocean Spray	Was located on the corner of Shirley St. and what is today Veteran's Road, approximately on the site of the used car dealership.
Playstead	Station existed off of Shirley street across from its intersection with Pearl St.
Winthrop Beach	Station existed at the corner of Shirley and what is now Washington St., approximately where DiParma's restaurant currently is.
Thornton	Station existed at the very southern end of Winthrop Street on the beach side of Pleasant, all the way down the hill, just past and to the right of the road. If you walk down into the brush there, you can see remnants of the rail bed next to the waters edge, heading towards Crystal Cove.
Winthrop Centre	Station was approximately where the Winthrop Center circle is today. A 12-foot portion of the old track was installed as a memorial in the 1990s and can be seen embedded in the asphalt of Hagman Road (which follows the track line today). In addition, one of the steel electric power supports remains as well; it can be located protruding from the sidewalk at the corner near the track remnant. An historical marker mounted next to the steel support provides some information about Winthrop's train history, as does a sign in the nearby park.
Ingalls	This station was located on the south corner of Walden street at Short Street. The line at this point ran alongside Walden Street on the west side of the road.

== Equipment ==
=== Steam locomotives ===
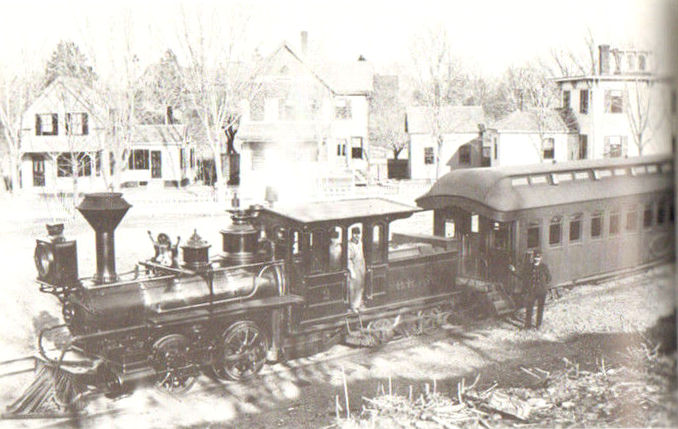
Pegasus at Winthrop Center in 1888

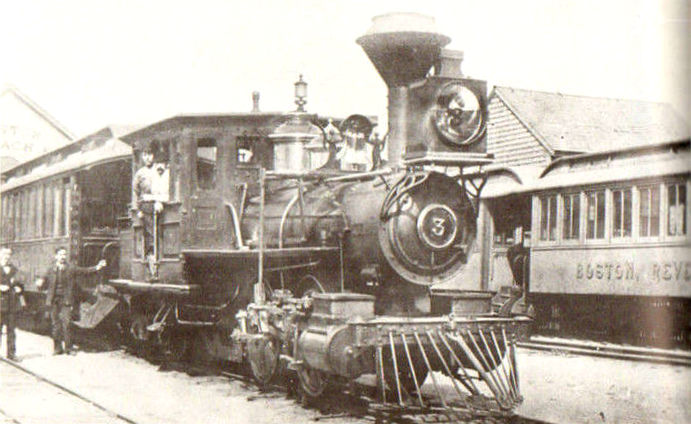
Jupiter at Lynn in 1876

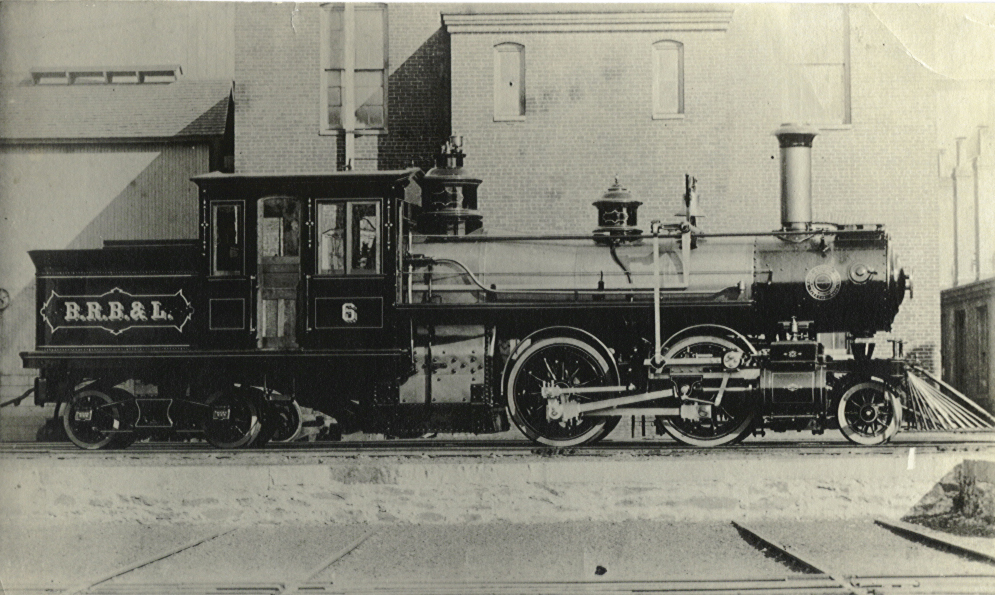
2-4-4 Mason Bogie locomotive #6 as built in 1886

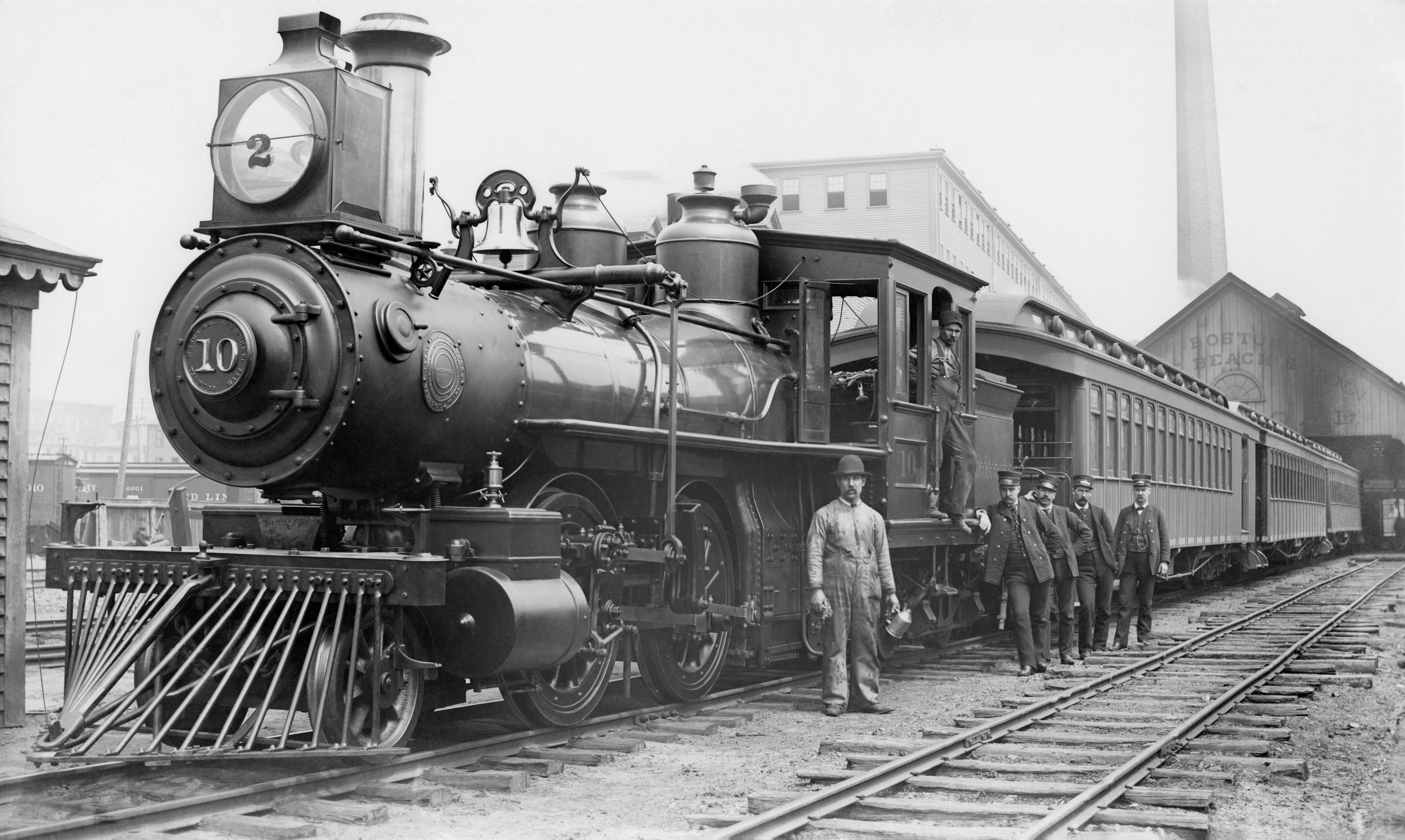
2-4-4 T Mason Bogie #10, Mason Machine Works, Taunton, MA. Built 1887. Photo location: Behind the Lynn Train Station. Photo Source: Lynn Museum

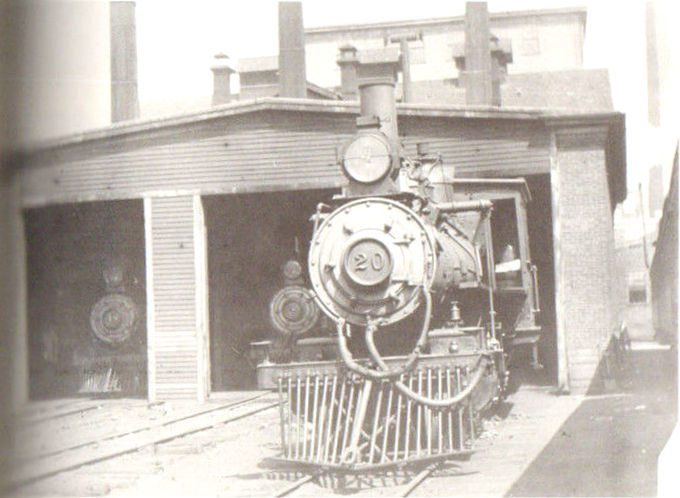
#18, #8, and #20 at Orient Heights car barn

Number	Name	Builder	Type	Date	Works number	Notes
1st # 1	Orion	Mason Machine Works	0-4-4T	1873	508	Built as North and South of Georgia - Sold to Nantucket Railroad #1 Sconset 1888
2nd # 1		Hinkley Locomotive Works	4-4-0	1879		Sold to Nantucket Railroad #1 1901
3rd # 1		ALCO Manchester	2-4-4T	1903	27801	Scrapped 1929
1st # 2	Pegasus	Mason Machine Works	0-4-6T	1875	549	Burned at Winthrop Junction (Orient Heights) and scrapped 1896
2nd # 2		Manchester Locomotive Works	2-4-4T	1899	1707	Scrapped 1929
1st # 3	Jupiter	Mason Machine Works	0-4-4T	1875	550	Leased to the Boston, Winthrop & Point Shirley Railroad in 1883, burned at Winthrop Junction (Orient Heights) and scrapped 1896
2nd # 3		Manchester Locomotive Works	2-4-4T	1899	1708	Scrapped 1929
1st # 4	Mercury	Porter Bell & Company	2-4-0	1876		Leased to the Boston, Winthrop & Shirley Railroad in 1878, burned at Winthrop Junction (Orient Heights) and scrapped 1896
2nd # 4		Mason Machine Works	2-4-6T	1882	683	Burned at Winthrop Junction (Orient Heights) 1896 and scrapped 1904
3rd # 4		ALCO Manchester	2-4-4T	1904	30125	Scrapped 1929
1st # 5	Leo	Hinkley Locomotive Works	4-4-0	1876	1240	Sold to Brown Company of Florida
2nd # 5		Mason Machine Works	2-4-4T	1885	720	Rebuilt 1917 - Scrapped 1929
1st # 6	Draco	Mason Machine Works	0-4-4T	1876	559	Scrapped 1885
2nd # 6		Mason Machine Works	2-4-4T	1886	727	Rebuilt in ALCO Manchester shops 1920 - scrapped 1929
7		Mason Machine Works	2-4-6T	1882	684	Rebuilt in ALCO Manchester shops 1920 - scrapped 1929
1st # 8		Mason Machine Works	2-4-4T	1883	692	Scrapped 1900
2nd # 8		Manchester Locomotive Works	2-4-4T	1900	1741	Scrapped 1929
9		Mason Machine Works	2-4-4T	1887	740	Scrapped 1929
10		Mason Machine Works	2-4-4T	1887	741	Scrapped 1929
11		Taunton Locomotive Manufacturing Company	2-4-4T	1890	981	Rebuilt 1917 - Scrapped 1929
12		Taunton Locomotive Manufacturing Company	2-4-4T	1890	982	Rebuilt in ALCO Manchester shops 1920 - scrapped 1929
13		Manchester Locomotive Works	2-4-4T	1900	1742	Scrapped 1929
14		ALCO Manchester	2-4-4T	1902	25872	Scrapped 1940
15		ALCO Manchester	2-4-4T	1903	27802	Scrapped 1929
16		ALCO Manchester	2-4-4T	1905	30499	Scrapped 1929
17		ALCO Manchester	2-4-4T	1906	39054	Scrapped 1929
18		ALCO Manchester	2-4-4T	1907	42268	Ran through the East Boston bumper block into Boston Harbor and scrapped 1928
19		ALCO Manchester	2-4-4T	1907	42741	Rebuilt 1917 - Scrapped 1929
20		ALCO Manchester	2-4-4T	1907	42742	Scrapped 1929
21		ALCO Manchester	2-4-4T	1907	42743	Scrapped 1929
22		ALCO Manchester	2-4-4T	1912	50830	Scrapped 1929
23		ALCO Manchester	2-4-4T	1912	50831	Scrapped 1929
24		ALCO Schenectady	2-4-4T	1914	54590	Scrapped 1929
25		ALCO Schenectady	2-4-4T	1914	54591	Scrapped 1929
26		ALCO Schenectady	2-4-4T	1914	54592	Scrapped 1929

=== Ferryboats ===
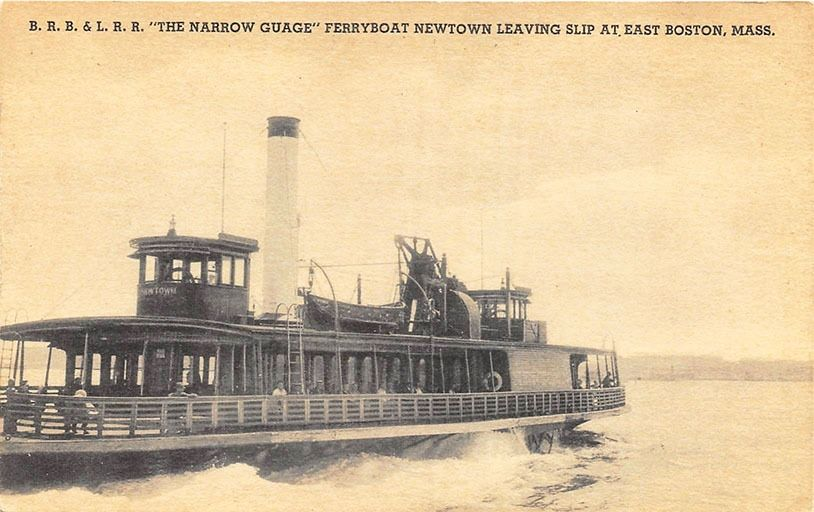
The Newtown, c. 1908-1915

Name	Date	Origin	Disposal
Union	1875	purchased from New Bedford-Taunton Railroad	Scrapped 1889
Oriole	1876	purchased from Providence, Warren & Fall River Railroad	Sold to Washington Railroad of Lunder, North Carolina 1878
City of Lynn	1878	Built by Bath Iron Works	Converted to a sand barge in 1918
Swampscott	1882	Built by D. D. Kelly & Son of Boston	Sold for Portland to Peaks Island ferry service in Casco Bay 1908
Dartmouth	1889	Built in East Boston	Retired 1939
Ashburnham	1905	Built in Boston	Sold 1940
Brewster	1906	Built in Boston	Sold 1940
Newtown	1908	Built in Boston	Towed to Portland, Maine in 1940
