= 2-4-6T =

Tank locomotive wheel arrangement

Diagram showing 2-4-6 wheel arrangement; front of locomotive on left.

In Whyte notation, a 2-4-6 is a steam locomotive with two unpowered leading wheels followed by four powered driving wheels and six unpowered trailing wheels. This wheel arrangement is only documented as being used for tank locomotives; no 2-4-6 tender locomotives are recorded.

== Equivalent classifications ==
Other equivalent classifications are:

- UIC classification: 1'B3' (also known as German classification and Italian classification)
- French classification: 123
- Turkish classification: 26
- Swiss classification: 2/6

The equivalent UIC classification is 1'B3' (or (1'B)'3' for a Mason Bogie).

== Examples ==
This unusual wheel arrangement does not appear to have been used in any country except the United States. The following railways are recorded as having used locomotives with this wheel arrangement:

- Pennsylvania Railroad: one locomotive built by Altoona in 1882
- Wisconsin Central Railroad: one locomotive built by Burnham, Parry, Williams & Co in 1887
- Boston, Revere Beach and Lynn Railroad: two locomotives built by Mason Machine Works in 1892
- Illinois Central Railroad: ten locomotives built by Rogers in 1893
- Adirondack and St. Lawrence Railroad: one locomotive built by Schenectady in 1893
