= Bavarian Pt 2/5 H =

Bavarian Pt 2/5 H DRG Class 73.2
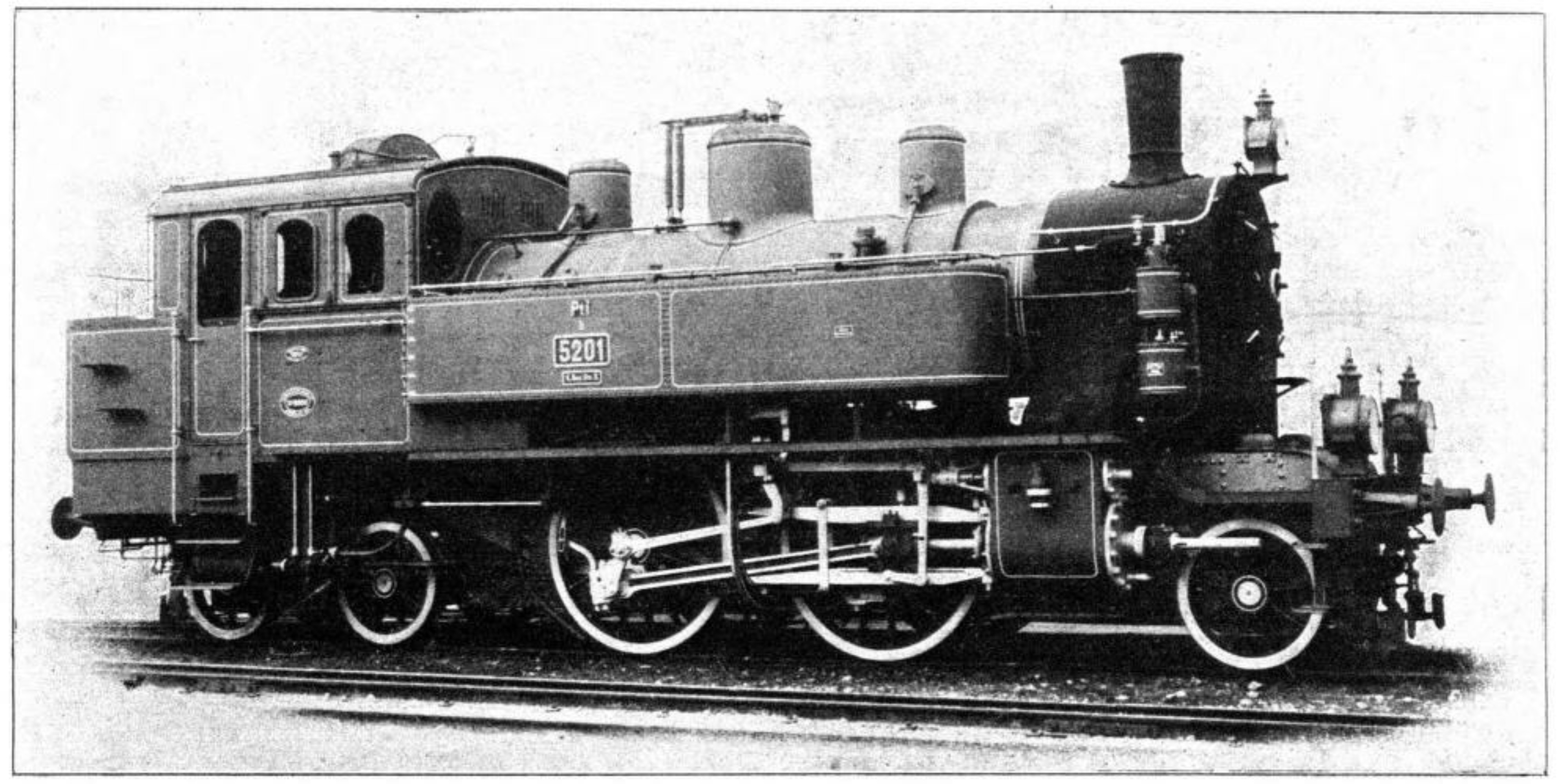
Type and origin
- Builder: Krauss
- Build date: 1906
- Total produced: 1
Specifications
- Configuration
  - Whyte: 2-4-4T
- Gauge: 1,435 mm (4 ft 8 1/2 in)
- Leading dia.: 1,006 mm (3 ft 3 5/8 in)
- Driver dia.: 1,640 mm (5 ft 4 5/8 in)
- Trailing dia.: 1,006 mm (3 ft 3 5/8 in)
- Length
  - Over beams: 11,894 mm (39 ft 1/4 in)
- Axle load: 16.0 t (15.7 long tons; 17.6 short tons)
- Adhesive weight: 32.0 t (31.5 long tons; 35.3 short tons)
- Service weight: 70.7 t (69.6 long tons; 77.9 short tons)
- Boiler pressure: 12 kgf/cm^{2} (1,180 kPa; 171 lbf/in^{2})
- Heating surface
  - Firebox: 1.96 m^{2} (21.1 sq ft)
  - Evaporative: 89.07 m^{2} (958.7 sq ft)
- Superheater
  - Heating area: 20.19 m^{2} (217.3 sq ft)
- Cylinders: 2
- Cylinder size: 500 mm (19 11/16 in)
- Piston stroke: 560 mm (22 1/16 in)
Performance figures
- Maximum speed: 90 km/h (56 mph)
Career
- Numbers: K.Bay.Sts.E: 5201; DRG: 73 201
- Retired: 1933

The Bavarian Class Pt 2/5 H locomotive of the Royal Bavarian State Railways (Königlich Bayerische Staatsbahn) was built by Krauss for the Nuremberg Trade Fair in 1906. Because this locomotive could no longer fully meet the performance requirements at that time, it remained a one-off. It was nevertheless taken over by the Reichsbahn and retired in 1933. The loco had a superheated steam system.

The engine was scrapped after retirement.

== See also ==
- Royal Bavarian State Railways
- List of Bavarian locomotives and railbuses
