= KkStB 269 =

Class of three Austrian 0-12-0T rack locomotives

kkStB 269 BBÖ 269 DRB Class 97.3 (2nd) ÖBB 197
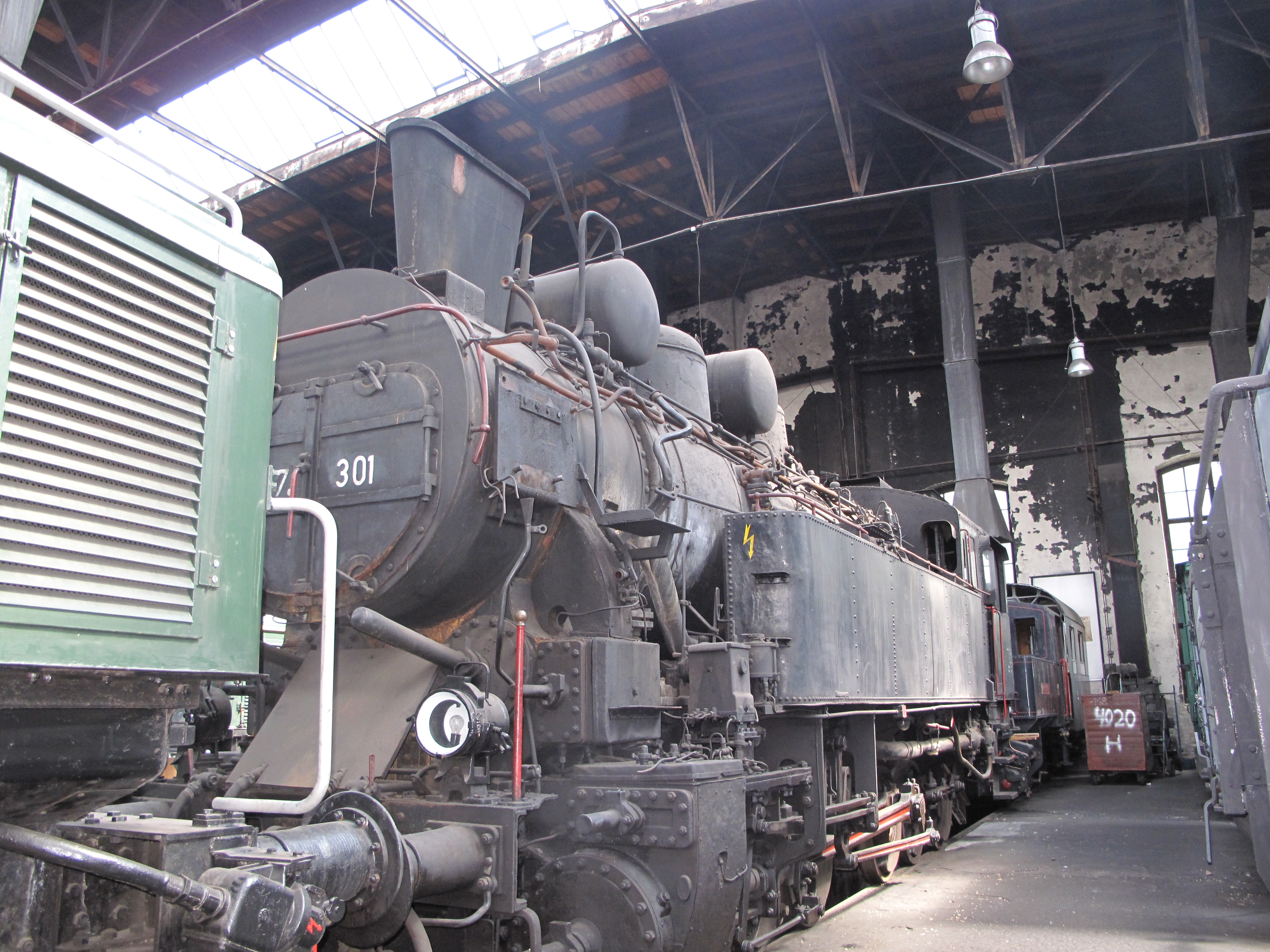
- KkStB Class 269 rack locomotive 197.301 at the Heizhaus, Strasshof
Type and origin
- Builder: Lokomotivfabrik Floridsdorf
- Build date: 1912
- Total produced: 3
Specifications
- Configuration
  - Whyte: 0-12-0T
- Gauge: 1,435 mm (4 ft 8 1/2 in)
- Driver dia.: 1,030 mm (3 ft 4 1/2 in)
- Service weight: 88.0 t (86.6 long tons; 97.0 short tons)
- Boiler pressure: 13 kgf/cm^{2} (1,270 kPa; 185 lbf/in^{2})
- Heating surface
  - Firebox: 3.3 m^{2} (36 sq ft)
  - Evaporative: 196 m^{2} (2,110 sq ft)
- Cylinders: 4 (Two adhesion, two rack)
- Cylinder size: 570 mm (22 7/16 in)
- Piston stroke: 520 mm (20 1/2 in)
- Cogwheel drive cylinder bore: 420 mm (16 9/16 in)
- Cogwheel drive piston stroke: 450 mm (17 11/16 in)
Performance figures
- Maximum speed: Adhesion: 30 km/h (19 mph); Rack: 20 km/h (12 mph)
- Indicated power: 1,120 PS (824 kW; 1,100 hp)
Career
- Numbers: kkStB: 269.01–269.03; BBÖ: 269.01–269.03; DRB 97 301 – 97 303; ÖBB: 197.301–197.303
- Retired: 1975–1978

The kkStB 269 was class of three rack railway 0-12-0 tank engines of the Imperial Royal Austrian State Railways (k.k. österreichische Staatsbahnen, kkStB) designed to work on the Erzberg Railway (Erzbergbahn) in Styria.

== History ==
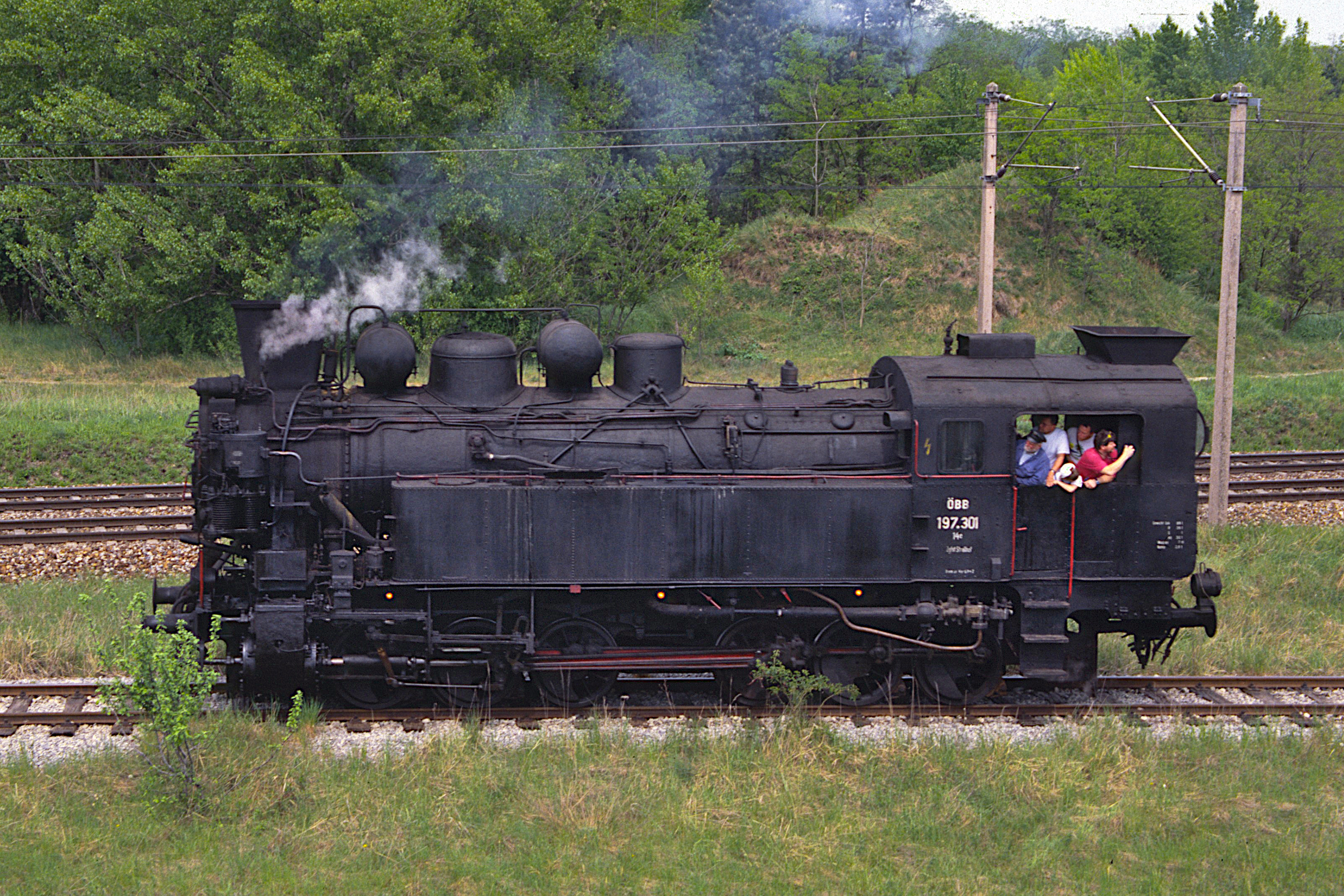
Museum lokomotive 197.01 in the Strasshof Railway Museum in April 2000

As early as 1911, the Erzbergbahn was no longer able to cope with operation with the 18 existing steam locomotives of the 69 series. Since a double-track expansion of the line was not possible, more powerful locomotives were required. On behalf of the kkStB, chief designer Karl Gölsdorf designed the class 269 rack railway steam locomotives; they were constructed by Lokomotivfabrik Floridsdorf in Vienna.

The result was a six-axle tank locomotive with the axle formula Fn4zzt: six coupled driving axles in a rigid frame and a gear drive with two gear wheels. This seldom used design as a twelve-coupled could transport 150 tonnes (150 long tons; 170 short tons) on this route at 15 km/h (9 mph) and should avoid the use of banker (pusher) locomotives. In 1912 the three new steam locomotives were put into operation and were given the designation 269.01 to 269.03. The designation 169 was already assigned to locomotives of the kkStB on the Tannwald-Grünthal line (today in the Czech Republic). Since there was no further orders, they could not completely replace the 69 class. Until the development of the 297 series in 1941, they were the most powerful cog railway locomotives in the world.

When it was taken over by the Deutsche Reichsbahn in 1938, the locomotives were given the designation 97 301 to 97 303. From 1953, the locomotives were given the ÖBB numbers 197.301 to 197.303 in order to differentiate themselves more clearly from the previous series 97.201–97.218. In 1953 the 197 series were equipped with Giesl ejectors, a performance-enhancing chimney construction. They were retired between 1975 and 1978.

The 197.301 was handed over to the Austrian Railway Museum in an operational condition in 1979 and is currently in the Strasshof Railway Museum in Lower Austria. It has not been put back into operation since its boiler ticket expired in 2002 As of 2020.
