= Württemberg Fz =

Württemberg Fz DR class 97.3
Type and origin
- Builder: Maschinenfabrik Esslingen
- Build date: 1893–1904
- Total produced: 9
Specifications
- Configuration
  - Whyte: 2-6-0T
  - German: Z 34.14
- Gauge: 1,435 mm (4 ft 8 1/2 in)
- Leading dia.: 945 mm (3 ft 1 1/4 in)
- Driver dia.: 1,230 mm (4 ft 3/8 in)
- Rack system: Riggenbach
- Length
  - Over beams: 9,490 mm (31 ft 1 1/2 in)
- Axle load: 13.8 t (13.6 long tons; 15.2 short tons)
- Adhesive weight: 41.5 t (40.8 long tons; 45.7 short tons)
- Empty weight: 43.0 t (42.3 long tons; 47.4 short tons)
- Service weight: 53.3 t (52.5 long tons; 58.8 short tons)
- Fuel capacity: 1.0 t (2,200 lb) of coal
- Water cap.: 4.2 m^{3} (920 imp gal; 1,100 US gal)
- Boiler pressure: 14 kgf/cm^{2} (1.37 MPa; 199 lbf/in^{2})
- Heating surface
  - Firebox: 1.40 m^{2} (15.1 sq ft)
  - Radiative: 7.00 m^{2} (75.3 sq ft)
  - Evaporative: 112.40 m^{2} (1,209.9 sq ft)
- Cylinder size: 612 mm (24 1/8 in)
- Piston stroke: 420 mm (16 9/16 in)
- Cogwheel drive cylinder bore: 420 mm (16 9/16 in)
- Cogwheel drive piston stroke: 540 mm (21 1/4 in)
- Loco brake: Westinghouse air brake (installed later), block brake (acting on the friction gears), band brake (acting on the crank disks of the transmission gears), spindle brake and steam brake with lateral blocks (acting on the rear ring gear), drum for Heberlein brake.
Performance figures
- Maximum speed: 50 or 20 km/h (31 or 12 mph)
Career
- Numbers: K.W.St.E. 691–694; later 591–599; DR: 97 301 – 97 307
- Retired: 1930

The Württenberg Fz was a class of nine 2-6-0T rack locomotives of the Royal Württemberg State Railways (Königlich Württembergische Staats-Eisenbahnen, K.W.St.E.). Seven of the Riggenbach rack system locomotives (Nos. 591 to 596 and 599) were taken over by Deutsche Reichsbahn and were placed in class (Baureihe) 97.3 in their 1925 renumbering plan.

The first four locomotives were named ACHALM, GRAFENECK, LICHTENSTEIN and MÜNSINGEN and were used on the Honau–Lichtenstein rack railway line. The five later locomotives were used between Freudenstadt and Klosterreichenbach. In contrast to the first four, these vehicles had a connecting pipe between the two steam domes.

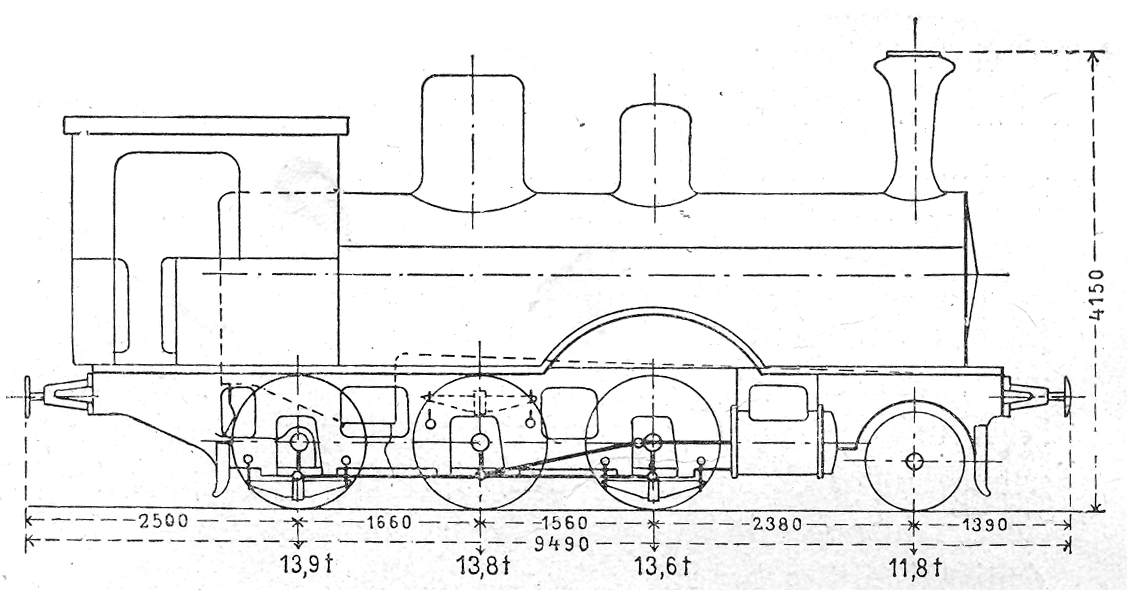
General arrangement drawing of the Württemberg Fz

The boiler and running gear were derived from the Württemberg F.

The locomotives had rack gears on the first and second axles, which were driven by a small gear in between. The small gear itself was driven by the inner two cylinders of the four-cylinder steam engine. The locomotives could be operated either as a compound, or as a four-cylinder simple. The valve gear and rack system drive were so complex and prone to failure that the locomotives were withdrawn and scrapped by the Deutsche Reichsbahn by 1930. The boiler also did not meet the requirements. The rack drive had to be kept engaged almost continuously when driving up the mountain, since the steam was used up too quickly, and stop had to be made for a 'breather' or 'blow up'.
