= 2-4-4T =

Tank locomotive wheel arrangement

Diagramatic representation of 2-4-4. Front of engine to the left.

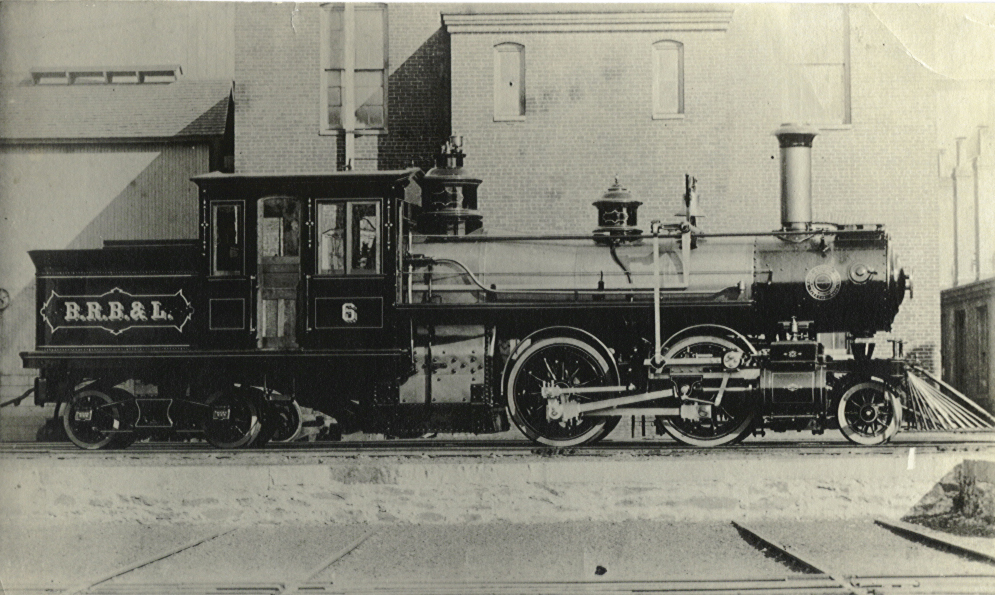
2-4-4 Mason Bogie locomotive #6 on the Boston, Revere Beach and Lynn Railroad as built in 1886.

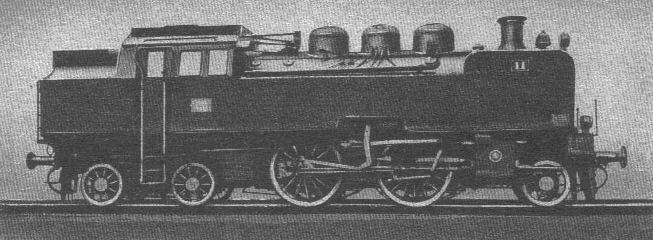
Lithuanian Tk

Under the Whyte notation for the classification of steam locomotives by wheel arrangement, 2-4-4 is a steam locomotive with two unpowered leading wheels followed by four powered driving wheels and four unpowered trailing wheels. This configuration was only used for tank locomotives.

== Equivalent classifications ==
Other equivalent classifications are:

- UIC classification: 1B2 (also known as German classification and Italian classification)
- French classification: 122
- Turkish classification: 25
- Swiss classification: 2/5

The equivalent UIC classification is 1′B2′ t (or (1′B)2′ t for a Mason Bogie).

== Examples ==
This unusual wheel arrangement does not appear to have been used on the mainline railways in the UK. It was however one of the configurations used on the Mason Bogie articulated locomotives, in the USA during the 1870s and 1880s. Five examples were constructed at the Mason Machine Works for the narrow gauge Boston, Revere Beach and Lynn Railroad 1883–1887. The railway subsequently received twenty-one further examples between 1900 and 1914, constructed by the Taunton Locomotive Manufacturing Company, Manchester Locomotive Works, and ALCO. Developmentally, there are two logical ways of reaching this wheel formula: to add a forward axle to a Forney locomotive to improve its ability to negotiate curves, or to add a second trailing axle to a Columbia design, notably in a 2-4-4(T) configuration to expand its coal capacity.

Four 2-4-4T passenger locomotives were built by the Czechoslovak Škoda for Lithuania in 1932 and marked as Tk class. They were seized by the USSR in 1940, then by the Germans. One was used after World War II in Poland as OKf100-1 until 1950.

Other tank locomotives with 2-4-4T arrangement:

- Bavarian D XII
- French T5 6601 - 6637 of AL railway
