= Lenox Street station =

Bus stop in Boston, Massachusetts, US

Lenox Street
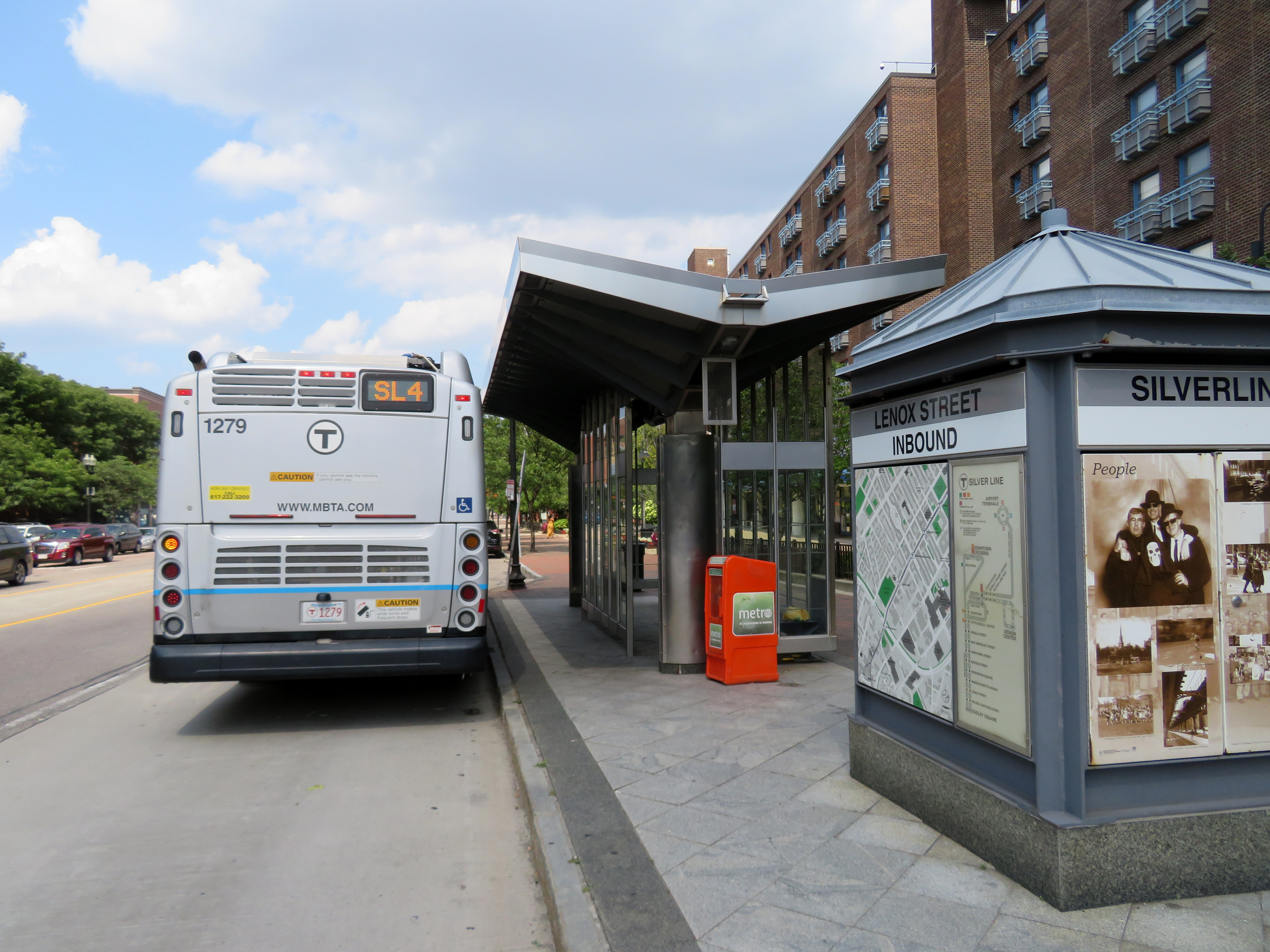
- A northbound route SL4 bus at Lenox Street in July 2019

General information
- Location: Washington Street at Lenox Street; Roxbury, Boston, Massachusetts
- Coordinates: 42.3351°N 71.0788°W
- Connections: MBTA bus: 8

Construction
- Cycle facilities: 2 spaces
- Accessible: Yes

History
- Opened: July 20, 2002

Passengers
- 2012: 508 (weekday average boardings)

Services
| Preceding station | MBTA | Following station |
|---|---|---|
| Melnea Cass Boulevard toward Nubian | Silver Line SL4 | Massachusetts Avenue toward South Station |
| Melnea Cass Boulevard toward Nubian | Silver Line SL5 | Massachusetts Avenue toward Downtown Crossing |
Location

Lenox Street station is a street-level bus station on the Washington Street branch of the MBTA Silver Line bus rapid transit service. It is located on Washington Street at Lenox Street in the Roxbury neighborhood of Boston, Massachusetts. The stop is served by the SL4 and SL5 Silver Line routes as well as local MBTA bus route 8. Like all Silver Line stops, Lenox Street is accessible.

Silver Line service on Washington Street began on July 20, 2002, replacing the route 49 bus. Service levels doubled on October 13, 2009, with the introduction of the SL4 route.
