= Worcester Square station =

Bus stop in Boston, Massachusetts, US

Worcester Square
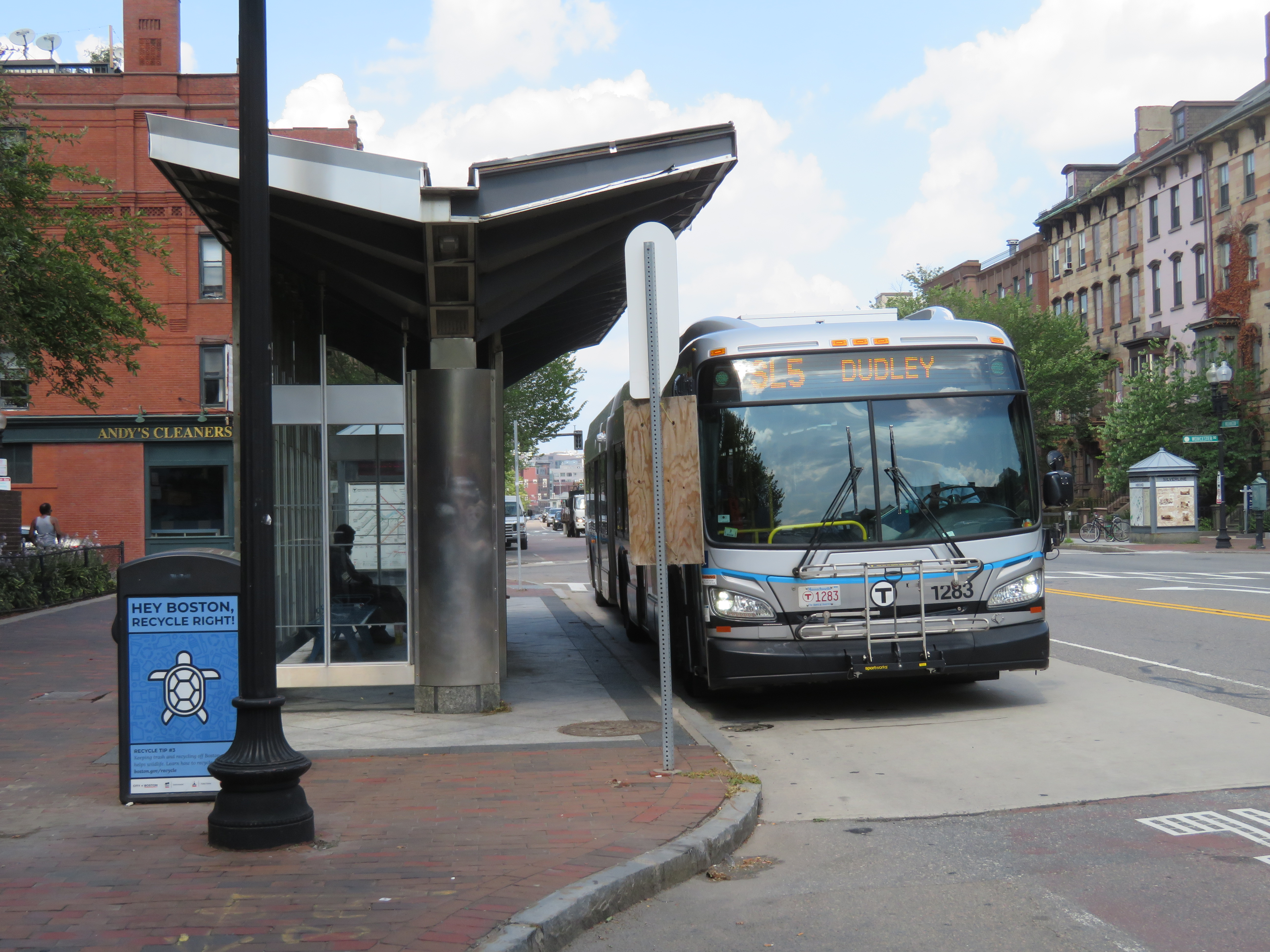
- An outbound Silver Line bus at Worcester Square in 2019

General information
- Location: Washington Street at Worcester Square; Boston, Massachusetts
- Coordinates: 42°20′14.6″N 71°4′33″W
- Connections: MBTA bus: 8

Construction
- Cycle facilities: 2 spaces
- Accessible: Yes

History
- Opened: November 30, 2002

Passengers
- 2012: 817 (weekday average boardings)

Services
Preceding station	MBTA	Following station
Massachusetts Avenue toward Nubian	Silver Line SL4	Newton Street toward South Station
Massachusetts Avenue toward Nubian	Silver Line SL5	Newton Street toward Downtown Crossing
Location

Worcester Square station is a street-level bus station on the Washington Street branch of the MBTA Silver Line bus rapid transit service. It is located on Washington Street at Worcester Square in the South End neighborhood of Boston, Massachusetts near the Boston Medical Center. The stop is served by the SL4 and SL5 Silver Line routes as well as local MBTA bus route 8. Like all Silver Line stops, Worcester Square is accessible.

Silver Line service on Washington Street began on July 20, 2002, replacing the route 49 bus. Worcester Square, which had been a stop for route 49, was not initially served by the Silver Line; it became a Silver Line stop on November 30, 2002. Shelters were added later. Service levels doubled on October 15, 2009, with the introduction of the SL4 route.
