= Northampton station (MBTA) =

Former rapid transit station in Boston, Massachusetts, US

Northampton
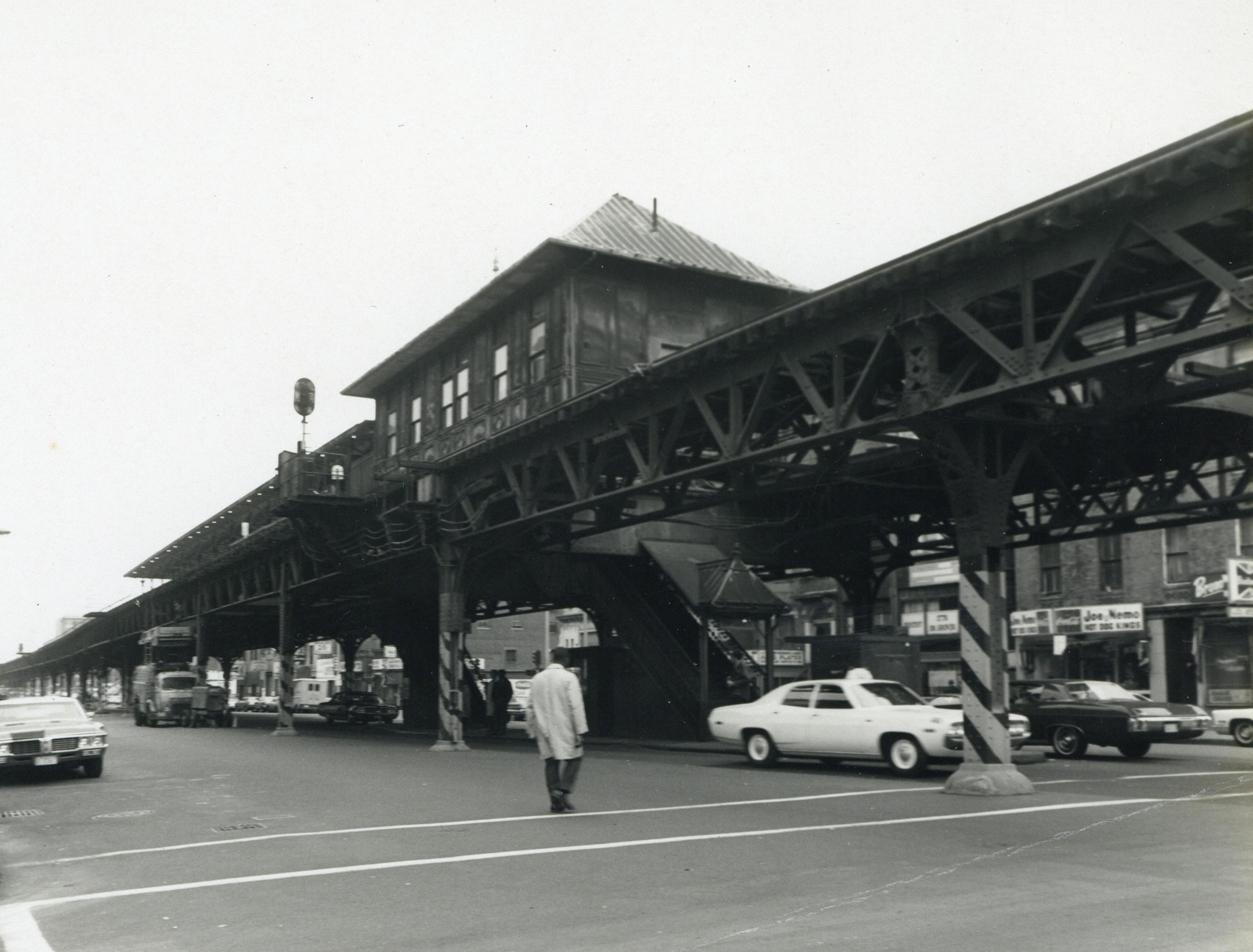
- Northampton station in the 1970s

General information
- Location: Washington Street at Massachusetts Avenue; Boston, Massachusetts
- Coordinates: 42.3363°N 71.0772°W
- Line: Washington Street Elevated
- Platforms: 2 side platforms
- Tracks: 2
- Connections: MBTA bus: 1, 8

Construction
- Cycle facilities: 2 spaces (Silver Line)
- Accessible: Yes (Silver Line)

History
- Opened: June 10, 1901; July 20, 2002 (Silver Line)
- Closed: April 30, 1987

Passengers
- 2012: 1,142 (weekday average boardings)

Services
| Preceding station | MBTA | Following station |
|---|---|---|
| Lenox Street toward Nubian | Silver Line SL4 | Worcester Square toward South Station |
| Lenox Street toward Nubian | Silver Line SL5 | Worcester Square toward Downtown Crossing |

Former services
| Preceding station | MBTA | Following station |
|---|---|---|
| Dudley Square toward Forest Hills | Orange Line Closed 1987 | Dover toward Oak Grove |
Location

Northampton station was an elevated rapid transit station located above Washington Street at Massachusetts Avenue in the South End neighborhood of Boston, Massachusetts. It served the Washington Street Elevated, part of the MBTA's Orange Line, from 1901 until 1987.

Massachusetts Avenue station, a street-level bus station on the Washington Street branch of the MBTA Silver Line bus rapid transit service, opened on the site in 2002. It is served by the SL4 and SL5 Silver Line routes as well as several local MBTA bus routes. Like all Silver Line stops, Massachusetts Avenue is accessible.

== History ==
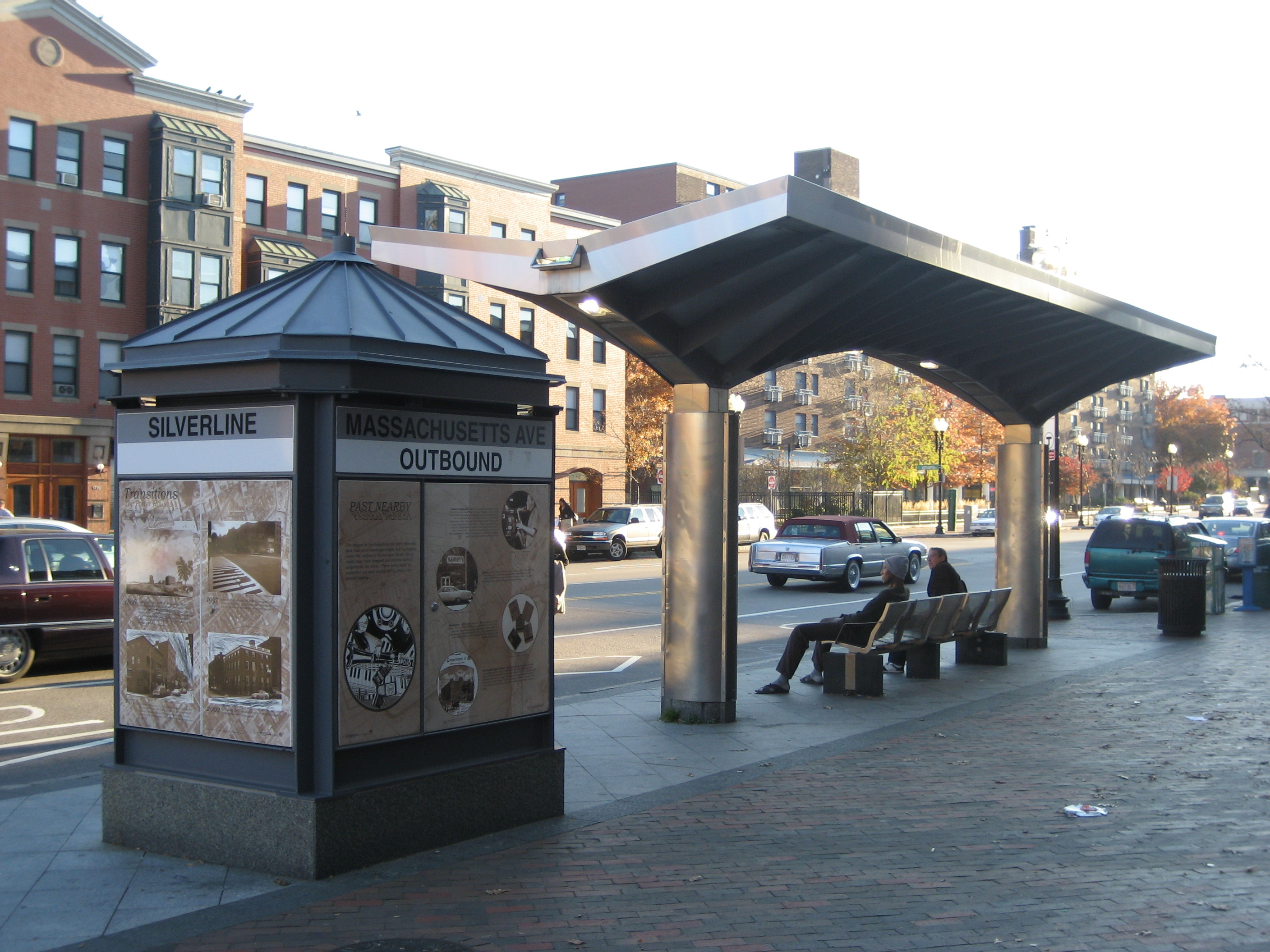
The southbound Silver Line shelter at Massachusetts Avenue in 2011

The Washington Street Elevated, including Northampton station, opened as part of the Main Line Elevated on June 10, 1901. It was originally built with a short center island platform, similar to Dover station to the north. Like most of the other Elevated stations, both were designed in a Beaux Arts style by Alexander Wadsworth Longfellow Jr. Mere months after opening, both stations had their platforms extended for four-car trains; the platforms at Northampton were extended again in 1908 to six-car length. Unlike Dover station, which was completely rebuilt in 1912, Northampton station received no substantial modifications other than the extended platform.

On December 5, 1960, the MTA began operating "modified express service" on the Elevated during the morning rush hour. Every other train bypassed four stops; Northampton was bypassed only by northbound trains, with southbound trains instead bypassing Egleston. This was discontinued in September 1961 to reduce wait times at the skipped stations, all of which were outdoors.

The Main Line Elevated was renamed the Orange Line in 1965. Northampton station was closed on April 30, 1987, when the Washington Street Elevated was closed and the Orange Line was rerouted to the west along the Southwest Corridor. Because it retained its original style, the station building at Northampton was selected for preservation. It was detached from the elevated structure and moved to the Seashore Trolley Museum in Kennebunkport, Maine in 1988. Around 1989, a gas station at the intersection of Massachusetts Avenue and Columbus Avenue was built to resemble the former station.

Silver Line service on Washington Street began on July 20, 2002, replacing the route 49 bus. Service levels doubled on October 15, 2009, with the introduction of the SL4 route.
