= Union Park Street station =

Bus stop in Boston, Massachusetts, US

Union Park Street
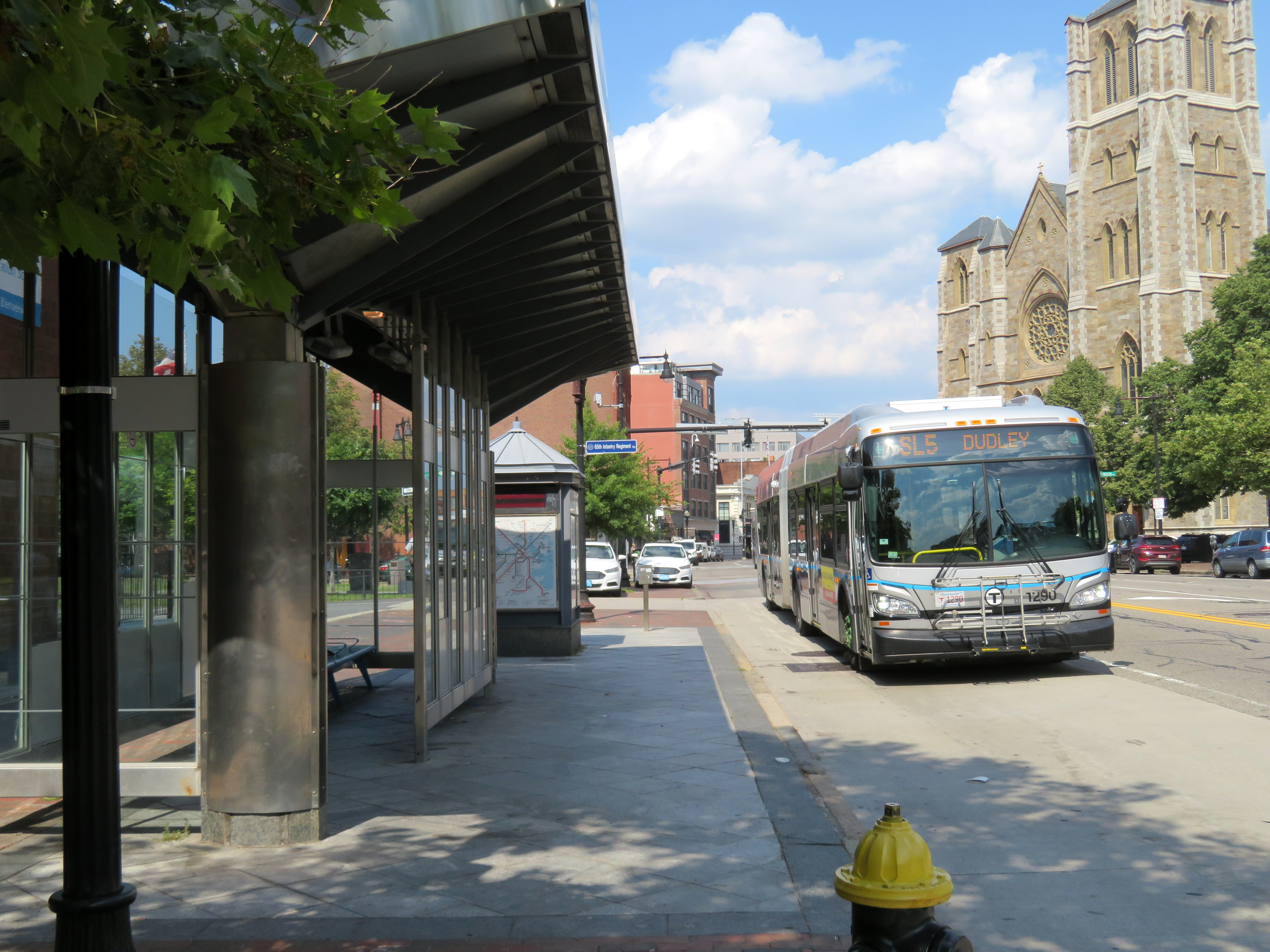
- An outbound bus at Union Park Street in 2019

General information
- Location: Washington Street at Union Park Street; Boston, Massachusetts
- Coordinates: 42.3414°N 71.0692°W
- Connections: MBTA bus: 8, 10

Construction
- Cycle facilities: 2 spaces
- Accessible: Yes

History
- Opened: July 20, 2002

Passengers
- 2012: 1,561 (weekday average boardings)

Services
Preceding station	MBTA	Following station
Newton Street toward Nubian	Silver Line SL4	East Berkeley Street toward South Station
Newton Street toward Nubian	Silver Line SL5	East Berkeley Street toward Downtown Crossing
Location

Union Park Street station is a street-level bus station on the Washington Street branch of the MBTA MBTA Silver Line bus rapid transit service in the South End neighborhood of Boston, Massachusetts. The bus stops are staggered - the inbound (northbound) stop is just north of Union Park Street, while the outbound stop is just south of West Dedham Street a block to the south. The southbound stop was located at Union Park Street until around 2006. Like all Silver Line stops, Union Park Street is accessible.

Silver Line service on Washington Street began on July 20, 2002, replacing the route 49 bus. Service levels doubled on October 15, 2009, with the introduction of the SL4 route.
