= Newton Street station =

Bus stop in Boston, Massachusetts, US

Newton Street
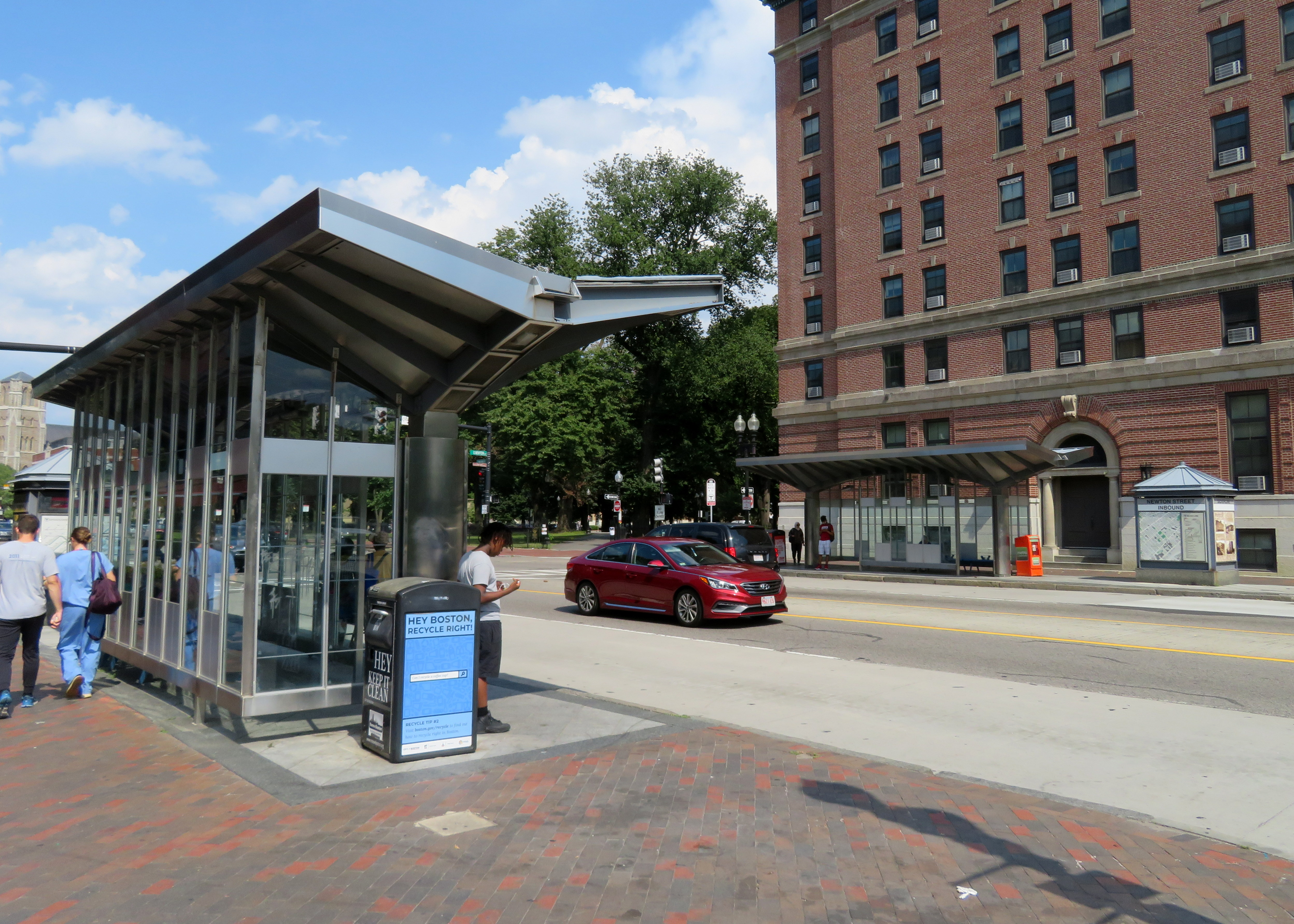
- The southbound Silver Line shelter at West Newton Street in 2019

General information
- Location: Washington Street at Newton Street; Boston, Massachusetts
- Coordinates: 42.3387°N 71.0738°W
- Connections: MBTA bus: 8, 10

Construction
- Cycle facilities: 2 spaces
- Accessible: Yes

History
- Opened: July 20, 2002

Passengers
- 2012: 1,570 (weekday average boardings)

Services
Preceding station	MBTA	Following station
Worcester Square toward Nubian	Silver Line SL4	Union Park Street toward South Station
Worcester Square toward Nubian	Silver Line SL5	Union Park Street toward Downtown Crossing
Location

Newton Street station is a street-level bus station on the Washington Street branch of the MBTA Silver Line bus rapid transit service. It is located on Washington Street just south of East Newton Street and West Newton Street in the South End neighborhood of Boston, Massachusetts near the Boston University Medical Campus. The stop is served by the SL4 and SL5 Silver Line routes as well as several local MBTA bus routes. Like all Silver Line stops, Newton Street is accessible.

Silver Line service on Washington Street began on July 20, 2002, replacing the route 49 bus. Service levels doubled on October 15, 2009, with the introduction of the SL4 route.
