= Silver Line (MBTA) =

Bus rapid transit system in Massachusetts, US

MBTA Silver Line
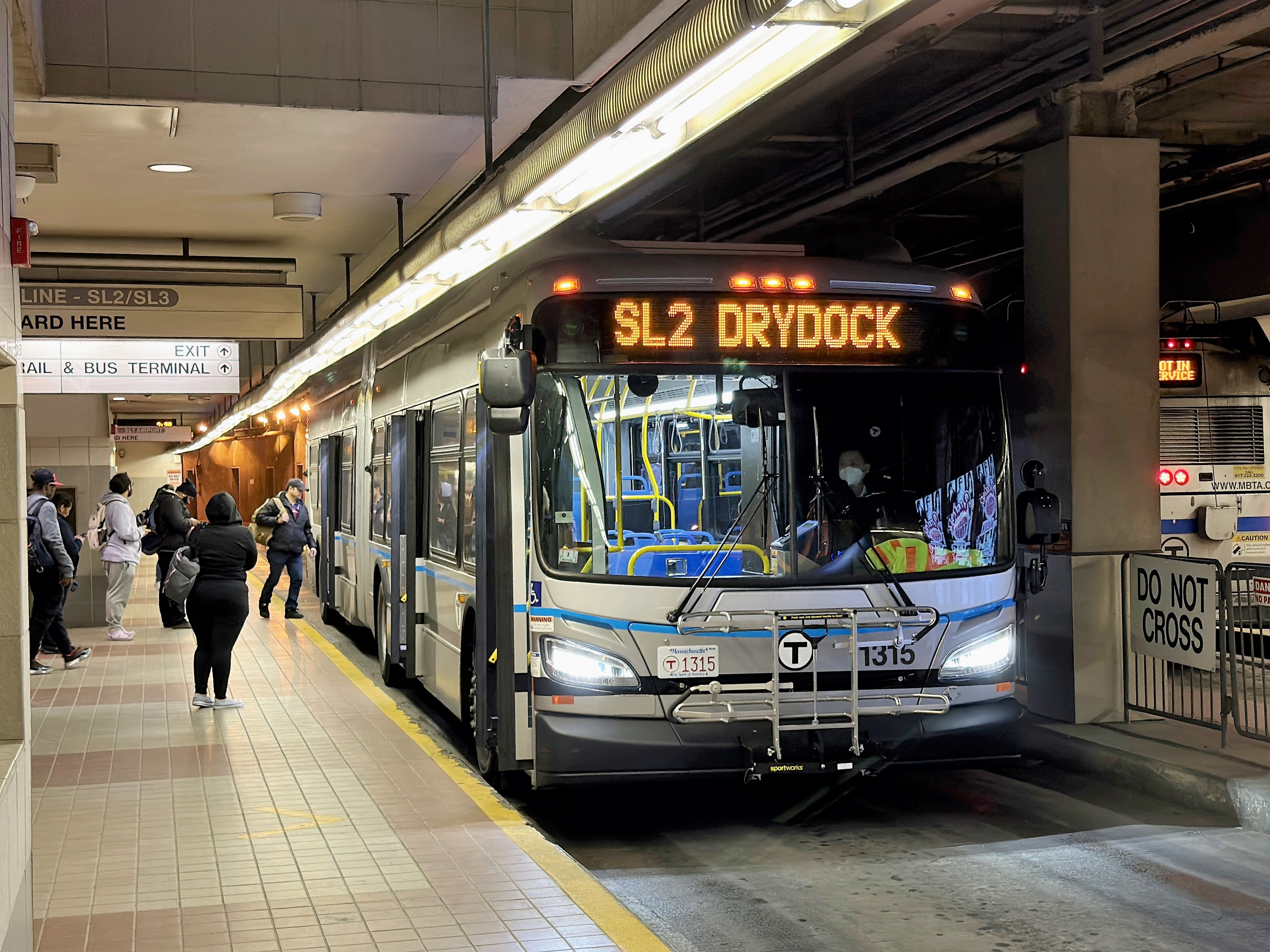
- A Silver Line bus at South Station in 2023
- Parent: Massachusetts Bay Transportation Authority
- Founded: July 20, 2002 (Washington Street); December 17, 2004 (Waterfront)
- Locale: Boston and Chelsea, Massachusetts, US
- Service type: Bus rapid transit (disputed)
- Routes: 6
- Stops: 15 (Washington Street); 20 (Waterfront)
- Hubs: South Station, Nubian
- Fleet: 21 (Washington Street); 50 (Waterfront)
- Daily ridership: 37,905 (July 2026)
- Fuel type: Diesel hybrid
- Website: MBTA – Bus
System map

The Silver Line is a bus route system in Boston and Chelsea, Massachusetts, operated by the Massachusetts Bay Transportation Authority (MBTA). It is operated as part of the MBTA bus system, but branded as bus rapid transit (BRT) as part of the MBTA subway system. Six routes are operated as part of two disconnected corridors. As of 2026, weekday ridership on the Silver Line was 37,905.

The four Waterfront routes operate out of an underground terminal at South Station and run through the South Boston Piers Transitway – a dedicated bus tunnel through the Seaport District with stations at Courthouse and World Trade Center. At Silver Line Way, they fan out on the surface: the SL1 to Logan International Airport, the SL2 to Dry Dock Avenue, and the SL3 to Chelsea via East Boston. An additional short turn route, SLW, runs only at peak hours between South Station and Silver Line Way. The Waterfront routes use mostly articulated diesel hybrid buses with extended battery range. Two routes operate on Washington Street between Nubian station (at Nubian Square in Roxbury) and Downtown Boston. The SL5 terminates at Downtown Crossing and the SL4 on the surface at South Station. The Washington Street routes use articulated diesel hybrid buses.

The Washington Street corridor was built to replace the Washington Street Elevated, which was used by the Orange Line rapid transit line until 1987. Initial plans called for a light rail branch of the Green Line, but trolleybuses and later CNG buses were substituted. Planning began in 1987 for mass transit to serve the growing Seaport; a new transit tunnel called the South Boston Piers Transitway was chosen in 1989. It was to run from Boylston to World Trade Center via Chinatown and South Station, though the Boylston–South Station section was later deferred as a separate phase. In 1999, the MBTA designated the Washington Street and Transitway projects as the Silver Line, and planned for the Boylston tunnel extension to include a portal to Washington Street for through-running. Service improvements on Washington Street began in 2001. After years of delays, service through the $624 million Transitway began on December 17, 2004.

The connecting tunnel (Phase III) was cancelled in 2010 due to rising costs; a surface route (SL4) was introduced the previous year. The original SL3 route to City Point was discontinued on March 20, 2009. A separate SL3 route to Chelsea – originally planned as part of the cancelled Urban Ring Project – began service on April 21, 2018. Extension of the SL3 route to Sullivan Square is planned. Several other Silver Line extensions have been proposed, as has a conversion of the Washington Street corridor to light rail, but most have not been pursued. The Silver Line has been the target of criticism by riders and transportation planners. Much of the system is missing BRT Standard features such as enforced dedicated lanes, off-vehicle fare collection, sheltered stations, and transit signal priority.

== Routes ==
=== Waterfront: SL1, SL2, SL3 ===
Three Silver Line services operate from South Station in a dedicated tunnel, the South Boston Piers Transitway, serving the underground Courthouse and World Trade Center stations in the Seaport District then splitting at the Silver Line Way surface station:

- SL1 Logan Airport–South Station
- SL2 Drydock–South Station
- SL3 Chelsea–South Station

During rush hours, additional short turns (designated SLW) are run between South Station and Silver Line Way to increase frequency in the Transitway.

Route SL2 runs on Northern Avenue, then on a one-way loop on Drydock Avenue and Black Falcon Avenue with multiple stops serving the Raymond L. Flynn Marine Park and the Flynn Cruiseport Boston. Buses run clockwise around the loop, with a layover at 23 Drydock Avenue. From Silver Line Way, route SL1 and SL3 buses loop backwards on Haul Road, then cross under Boston Harbor in the Ted Williams Tunnel to East Boston. Route SL1 loops around the Logan International Airport terminals, with stops at the arrivals level of each terminal (including two separate stops at lengthy Terminal B). Route SL3 serves Airport station, follows the Coughlin Bypass Road, and crosses Chelsea Creek on the Chelsea Street Bridge. It then follows a dedicated busway to Chelsea, with intermediate stops at Eastern Avenue, Box District, and Bellingham Square. The three Transitway stops are full rapid transit stations; the Chelsea busway stations have large concrete shelters, while most other surface stops have small shelters.

The Waterfront routes have regular rapid transit fares. Passengers enter through faregates at the three Transitway stations, and pay at the on-board farebox at all other stops. Fares are free when boarding at the Logan Airport stops. Transfer is possible to the Red Line within fare control at South Station. Normal transfers to other routes are available with a CharlieCard; transfers to/from the Blue Line at Airport and the Washington Street routes are available with a CharlieTicket.

The Waterfront routes use 60-foot (18 m) articulated buses with three doors, which provide greater capacity than standard 40-foot (12 m) transit buses. The buses are low-floor and fully accessible, with kneeling bus technology and a wheelchair ramp at the front door. The main Waterfront fleet consists of 45 diesel hybrid buses with extended battery range – sufficient to run through the Transitway on battery power – which were delivered in 2022–2023. A similar extended-battery-range hybrid bus built in 2018 and five battery electric buses built in 2019 are also used. All Silver Line buses are maintained at Southampton Street Garage.

The Waterfront routes previously used dual-mode buses which operated as electric trolleybuses between South Station and Silver Line Way, and as conventional diesel buses on the surface branches. The 32 dual-mode buses, built by Neoplan USA, were delivered in 2004–05 and overhauled from 2014 to 2018. Eight of the buses were funded by Massport and included luggage racks for airport passengers. The dual-mode buses (and overhead lines in the Transitway) proved difficult to maintain and required a time-consuming switch between modes at Silver Line Way. In 2018–19, the MBTA obtained several buses to test alternate options for Waterfront service. A single New Flyer diesel hybrid bus with extended battery range was obtained as an option on a separate order; it entered testing in September 2018 and revenue service in December. On July 31, 2019, the MBTA began using five New Flyer battery electric buses on both Waterfront and Washington Street routes. In November 2020, the MBTA exercised a contract option for 45 additional 60-foot hybrid buses with extended battery range similar to the 2018 test bus to replace the dual-mode Silver Line fleet. The final dual-mode buses were retired in July 2023, ending trolleybus operations in the Boston area.

==== Station listing ====
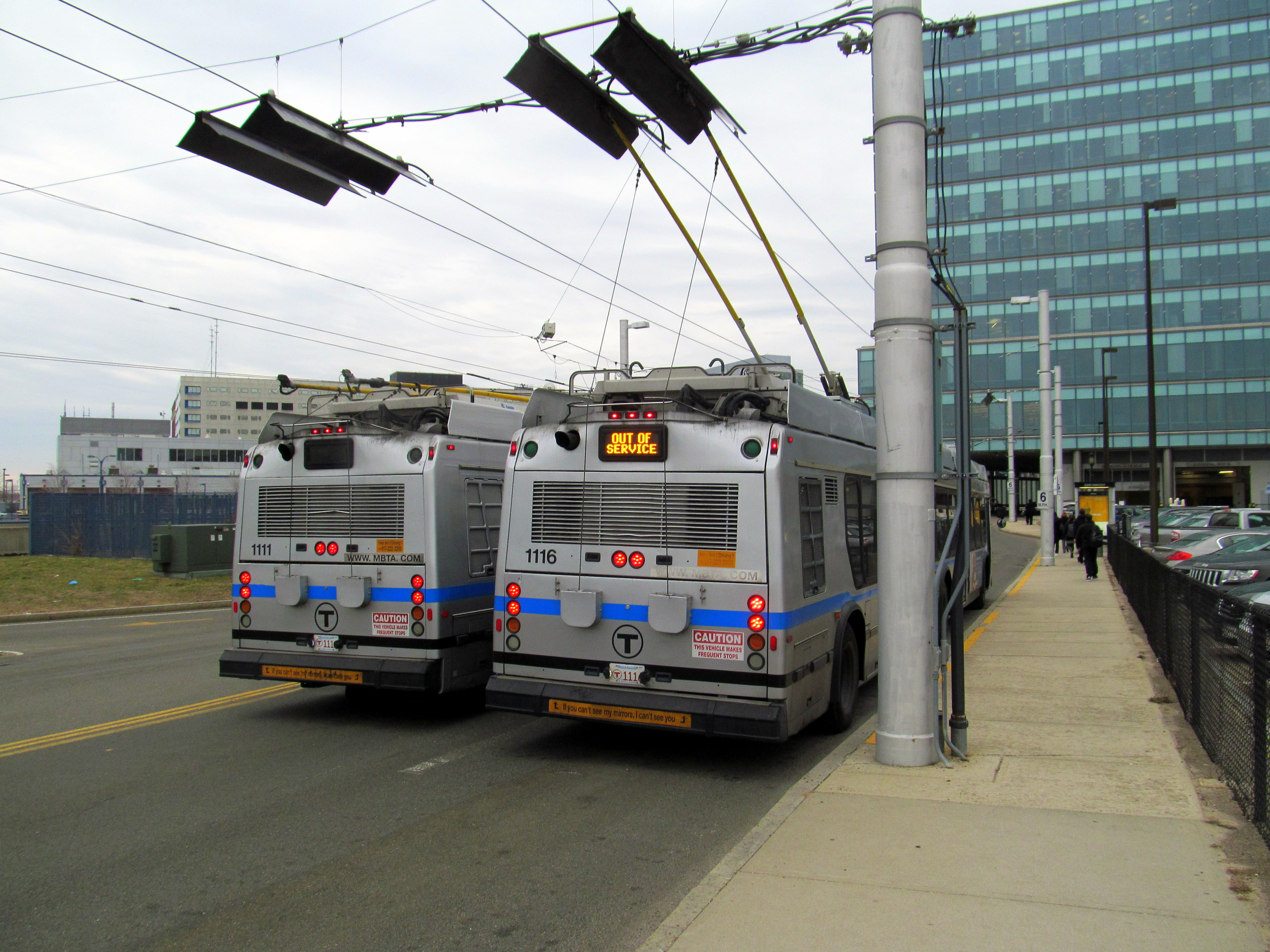
The power changeover at Silver Line Way in 2016; the wires have since been dismantled

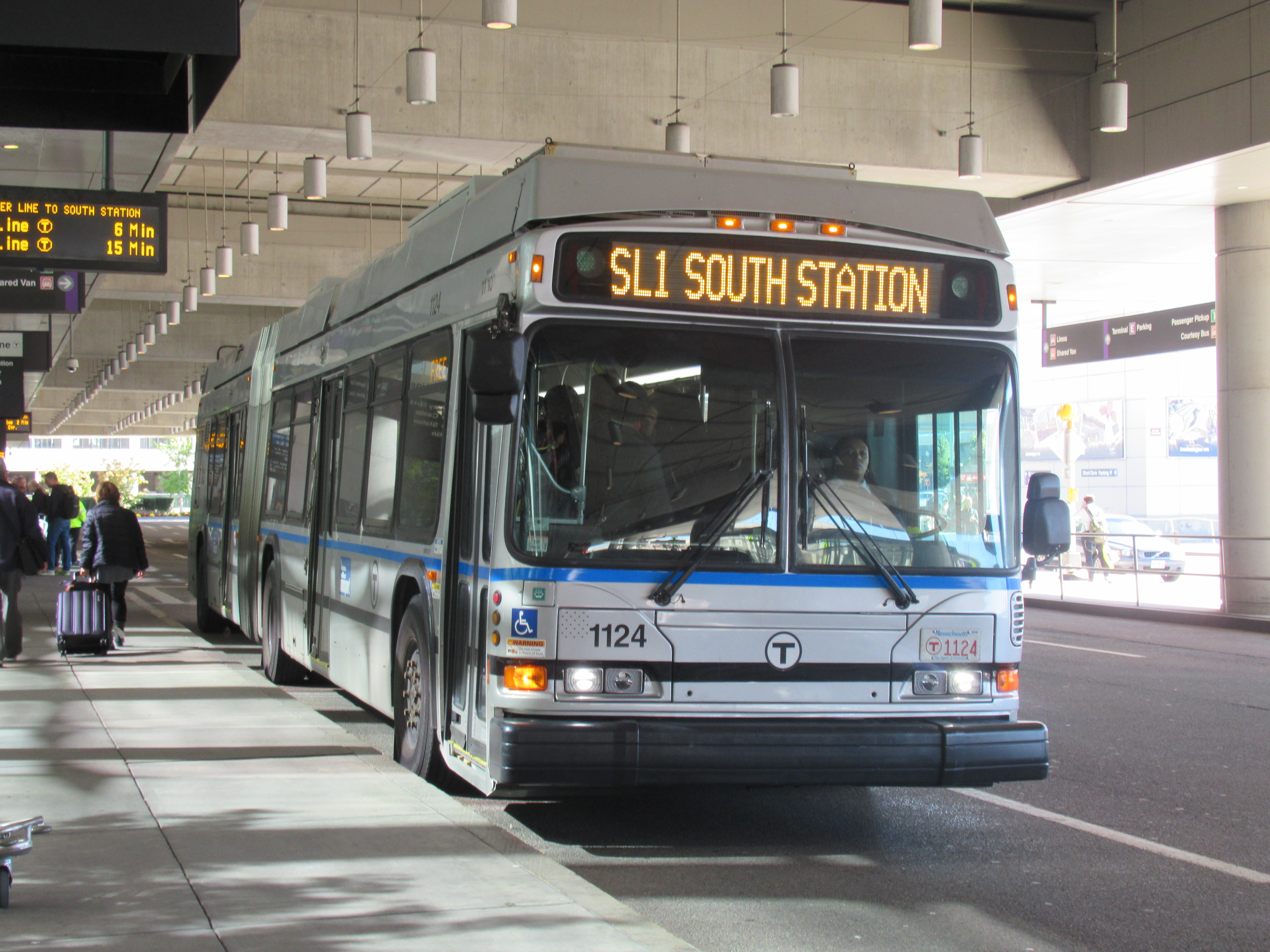
An SL1 bus at Logan Airport Terminal E

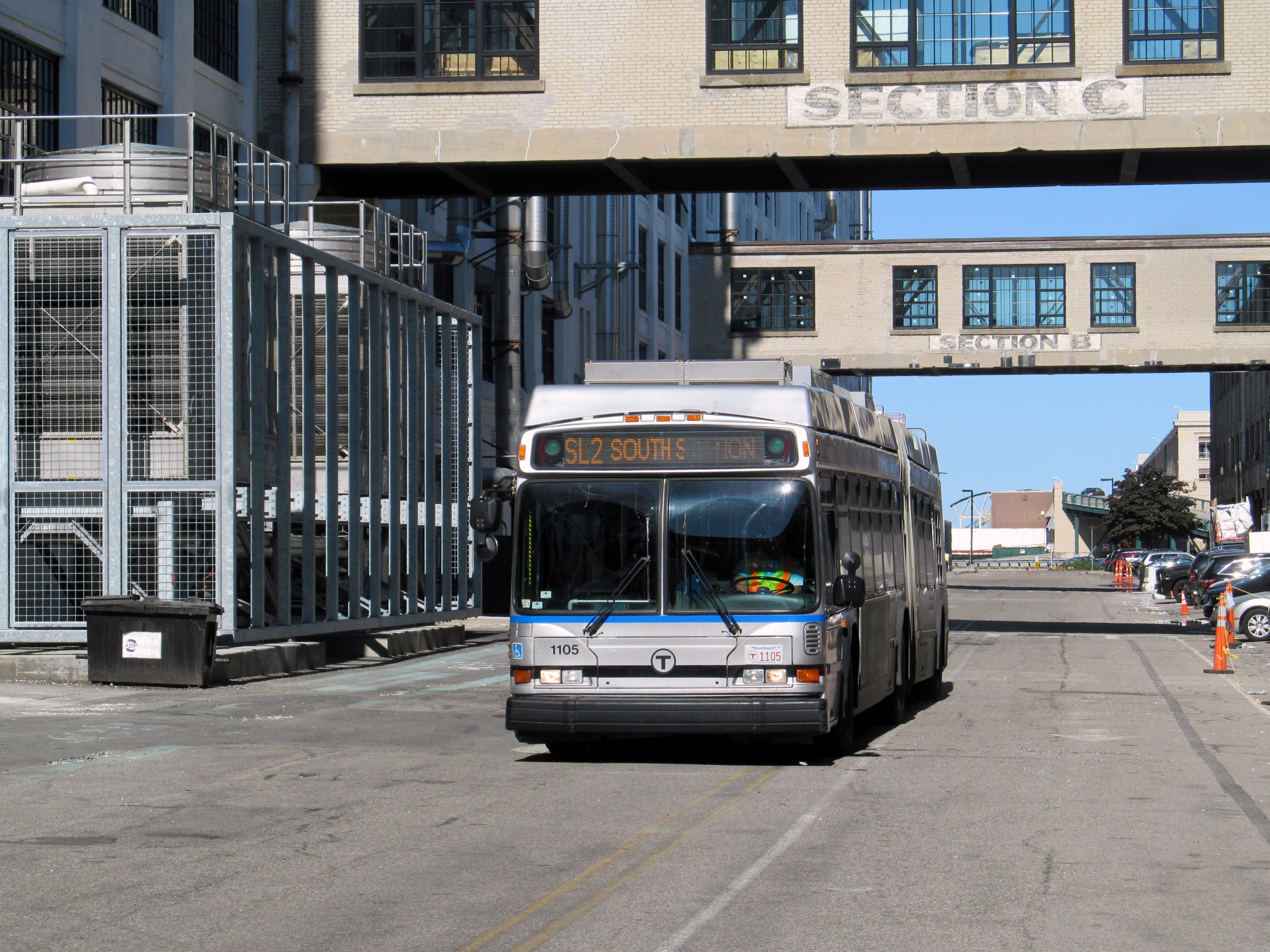
An SL2 bus on Black Falcon Avenue

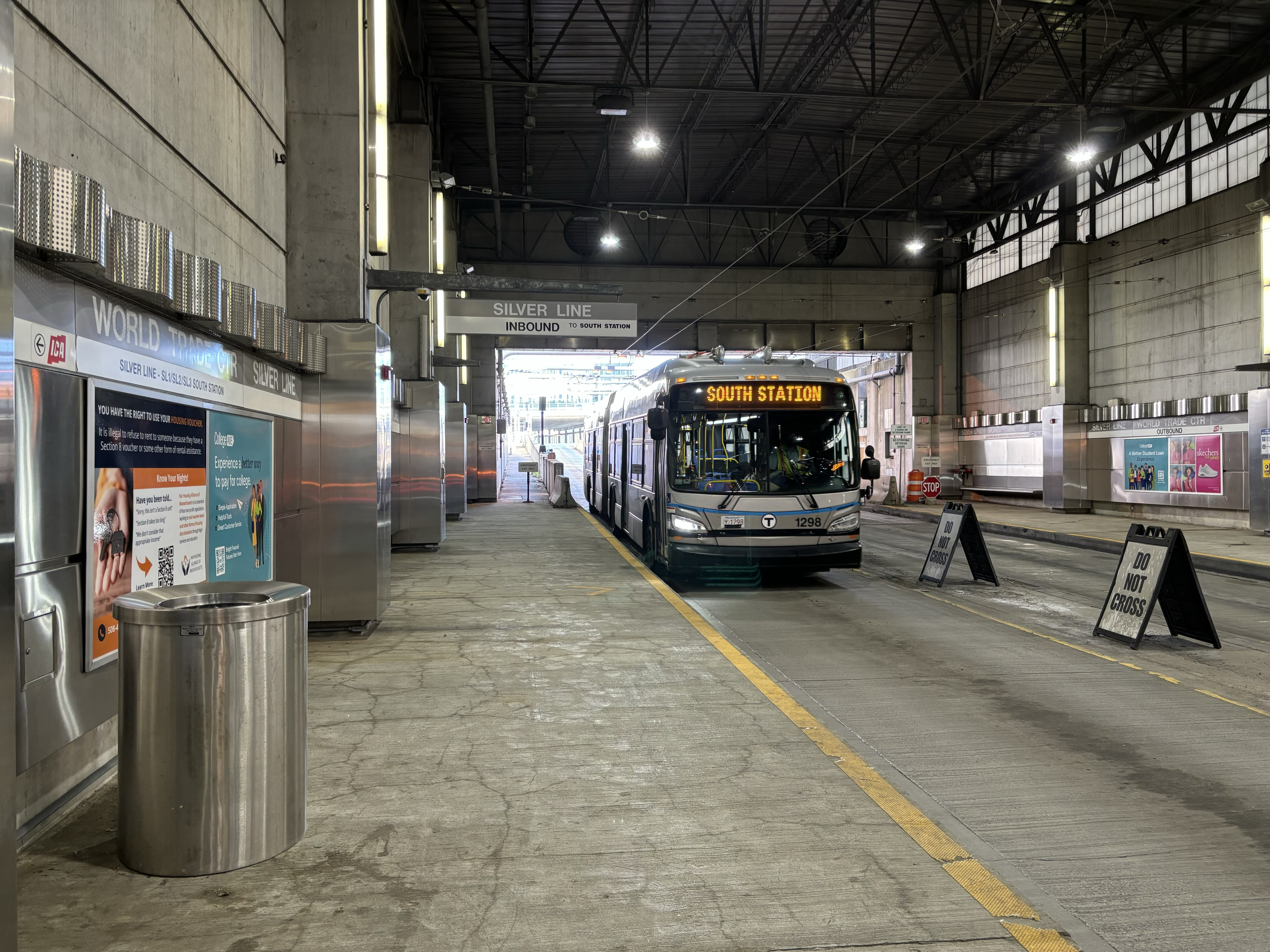
An SLW bus at World Trade Center station

| Location | Station | Services | | | | Service began | Transfers and notes |
| Location | Station | SL1 | SL2 | SL3 | SLW | Service began | Transfers and notes |
|---|---|---|---|---|---|---|---|
| Financial; District | South Station | ● | ● | ● | ● | December 17, 2004 | Amtrak: Acela, Lake Shore Limited, Northeast Regional; MBTA Commuter Rail: Fairmount Line, Fall River/New Bedford Line, Framingham/Worcester Line, Franklin/Foxboro Line, Greenbush Line, Kingston Line, Needham Line, Providence/Stoughton Line, CapeFLYER (seasonal); MBTA subway: Red Line, Silver Line (SL4); MBTA bus: 4, 7, 11; Intercity buses at South Station Bus Terminal |
| Seaport; District | Courthouse | ● | ● | ● | ● | December 17, 2004 | MBTA bus: 4 |
| Seaport; District | World Trade Center | ● | ● | ● | ● | December 17, 2004 | |
| Seaport; District | Silver Line Way | ● | ● | ● | ● | December 17, 2004 | |
| East; Boston | Terminal A | ● | | | | June 1, 2005 | MBTA bus: 171; Massport: 11, 22, 55, 66, 88; Intercity buses and Logan Express |
| East; Boston | Terminal B Stop 1 | ● | | | | June 1, 2005 | MBTA bus: 171; Massport: 11, 22, 55, 66, 88; Intercity buses and Logan Express |
| East; Boston | Terminal B Stop 2 | ● | | | | June 1, 2005 | MBTA bus: 171; Massport: 11, 22, 55, 66, 88; Intercity buses and Logan Express |
| East; Boston | Terminal C | ● | | | | June 1, 2005 | MBTA bus: 171; Massport: 11, 33, 55, 66, 88; Intercity buses and Logan Express |
| East; Boston | Terminal E | ● | | | | June 1, 2005 | MBTA bus: 171; Massport: 11, 33, 55, 66, 88; Intercity buses and Logan Express |
| East; Boston | Airport | | | ● | | April 21, 2018 | MBTA subway: Blue Line; MBTA bus: 104, 171; Massport: 22, 33, 55, 66, 88 |
| Chelsea | Eastern Avenue | | | ● | | April 21, 2018 | MBTA bus: 104, 112 |
| Chelsea | Box District | | | ● | | April 21, 2018 | |
| Chelsea | Bellingham Square | | | ● | | April 21, 2018 | MBTA bus: 104, 111, 112, 114, 116 |
| Chelsea | Chelsea | | | ● | | April 21, 2018 | MBTA bus: 112, 114; MBTA Commuter Rail: Newburyport/Rockport Line; Lower Mystic Link |
| South; Boston | Northern Avenue & Harbor Street | | ● | | | December 31, 2004 | MBTA bus: 4 |
| South; Boston | Northern Avenue & Tide Street | | ● | | | December 31, 2004 | MBTA bus: 4 |
| South; Boston | 23 Drydock Avenue | | ● | | | c. 2006 | Relocated from 21 Drydock Avenue in 2016 |
| South; Boston | 27 Drydock Avenue | | ● | | | December 31, 2004 | Former stop at 25 Drydock Avenue closed in January 2016, relocated stop opened 2018 |
| South; Boston | Drydock Avenue & Black Falcon Avenue | | ● | | | December 31, 2004 | Replacement stop for 88 Black Falcon Avenue during nights and poor weather until January 2016; official stop since 2018 |
| South; Boston | Design Center | | ● | | | December 31, 2004 | MBTA bus: 4 |

==== Former stops ====
| Neighborhood | Station | Served by | Service began | Service ended | Notes |
|---|---|---|---|---|---|
| South Boston | 88 Black Falcon Avenue | SL2 | December 31, 2004 | April 2019 | Temporarily closed in April 2019 due to pier repair; permanent closure effective March 13, 2022. Service was planned to resume on June 19, 2022, but this was cancelled. |
| South Boston | Black Falcon Avenue & Design Center Place | SL2 | December 31, 2004 | 2014 | |
| South Boston | Summer Street & Powerhouse Street | SL3 | December 31, 2004 | March 20, 2009 | Discontinued due to low ridership |
| South Boston | East 1st Street & M Street | SL3 | December 31, 2004 | March 20, 2009 | Discontinued due to low ridership |
| South Boston | City Point | SL3 | December 31, 2004 | March 20, 2009 | Discontinued due to low ridership |
| South Boston | Farragut Road | SL3 | April 9, 2005 | August 20, 2005 | Rerouted due to noise complaints |

=== Washington Street: SL4 and SL5 ===
Two Silver Line routes run between Nubian station (at Nubian Square in Roxbury) and Downtown Boston along Washington Street:

- SL4 Nubian station–South Station
- SL5 Nubian station–Downtown Crossing

These two routes share most of their routing on Washington Street between Nubian Square and Tufts Medical Center, with dedicated lanes for most of the corridor and eight intermediate stops. North of Kneeland Street, the routes run on separate one-way loops. The SL5 runs north on Washington Street to Temple Place (between Downtown Crossing and Park Street, with an intermediate stop at Chinatown. It returns south on Tremont Street, with a southbound stop at Boylston. The SL4 runs north on Washington Street to Chinatown, then east on Essex Street (with a dedicated lane) to a surface stop at South Station. It returns south on Surface Road and Kneeland Street. Most stops have a canopy shelter with seating, maps, and a real-time arrival information display.

The two routes have the same fare as local bus services (lower than rapid transit), with normal transfers with a CharlieCard. In recognition of their role as replacement for the Orange Line, transfers are also available with a paper CharlieTicket (which normally does not allow transfers). This was inherited from the previous route 49 bus, which had free transfers (with the flat token fare) to and from the Orange Line only at New England Medical Center.

The Washington Street routes use 60-foot (18 m) diesel hybrid articulated buses with three doors. The buses are low-floor and fully accessible, with kneeling bus technology and a wheelchair ramp at the front door. The routes use 21 New Flyer buses delivered in 2016–17 (part of a 44-bus order also used on routes 28 and 39), which replaced the original compressed natural gas (CNG) buses, plus three similar hybrid buses delivered in 2010. All Silver Line buses are maintained at Southampton Street Garage.

==== Station listing ====
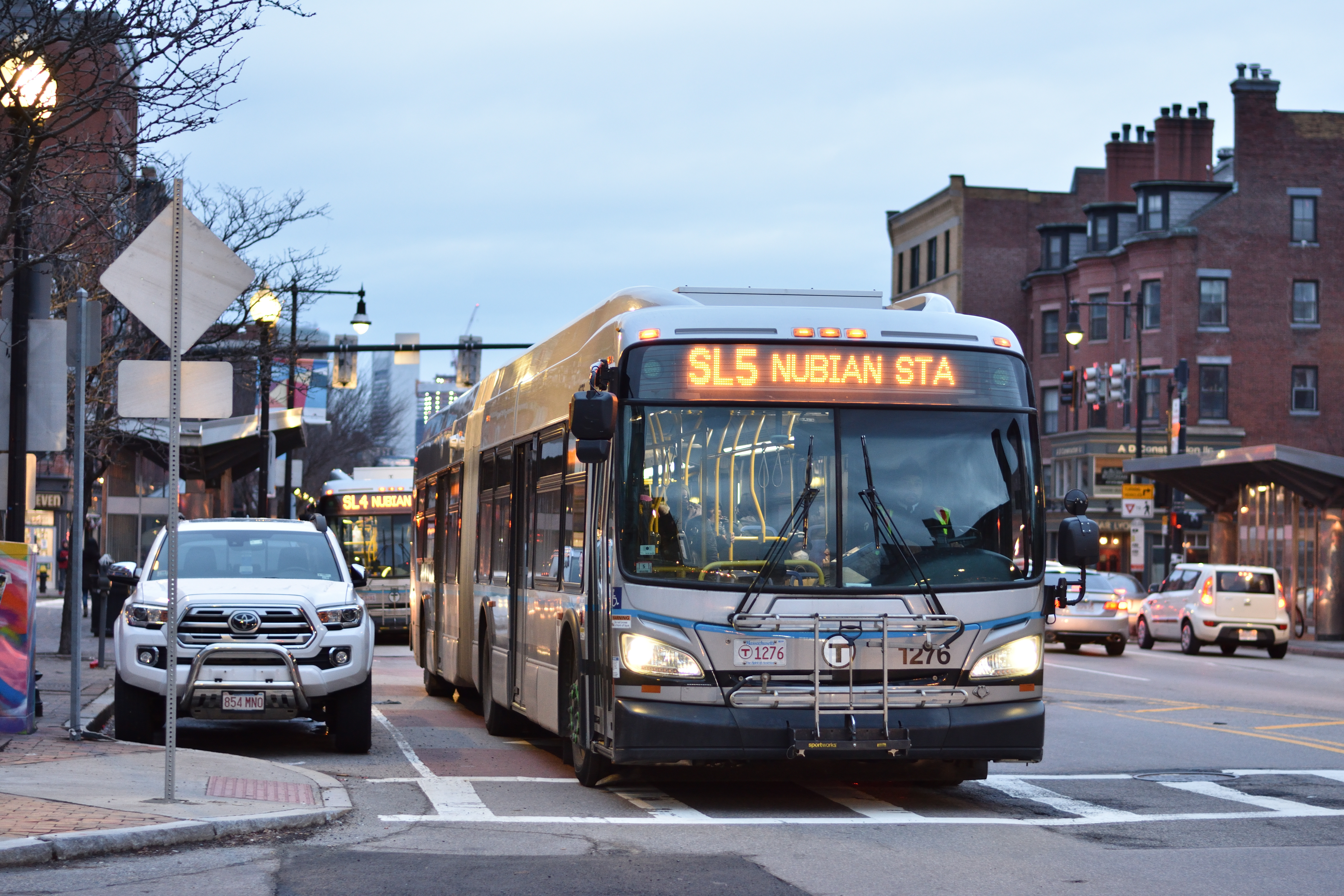
Route SL5 and SL4 buses on Washington Street

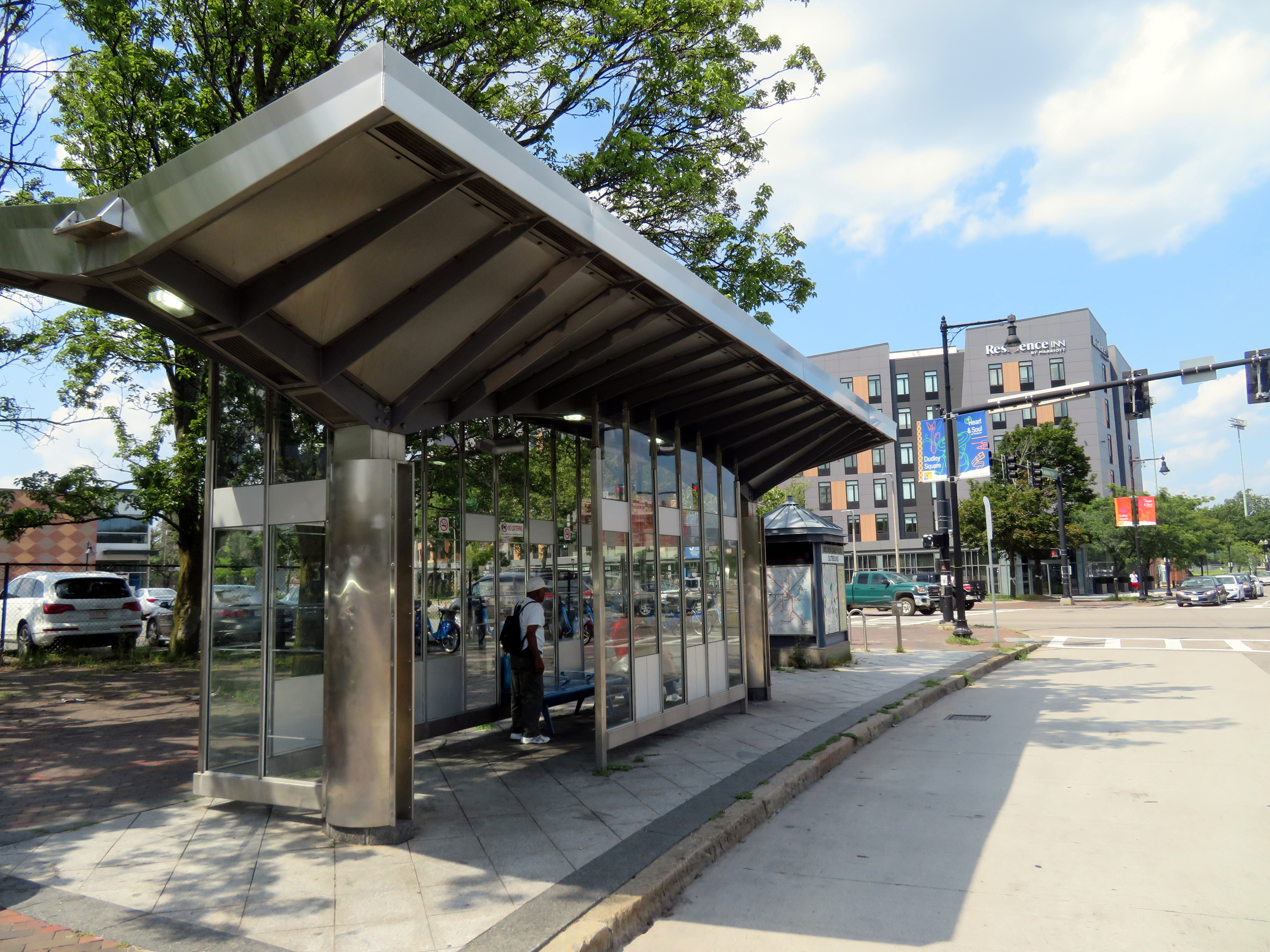
Melnea Cass Boulevard, a typical Washington Street stop

| Neighborhood | Station | Services | | Service began | Transfers and notes |
| Neighborhood | Station | SL4 | SL5 | Service began | Transfers and notes |
|---|---|---|---|---|---|
| Roxbury | Nubian | ● | ● | July 20, 2002 | MBTA bus: 1, 8, 14, 15, 19, 23, 28, 29, 41, 42, 44, 45, 47, 66, 171 |
| Roxbury | Melnea Cass Boulevard | ● | ● | July 20, 2002 | MBTA bus: 1, 8, 19, 47, 171, CT3 |
| South End | Lenox Street | ● | ● | July 20, 2002 | MBTA bus: 8 |
| South End | Massachusetts Avenue | ● | ● | July 20, 2002 | MBTA bus: 1, 8 |
| South End | Worcester Square | ● | ● | November 30, 2002 | MBTA bus: 8 |
| South End | Newton Street | ● | ● | July 20, 2002 | MBTA bus: 8, 10 |
| South End | Union Park Street | ● | ● | July 20, 2002 | MBTA bus: 8, 10 |
| South End | East Berkeley Street | ● | ● | July 20, 2002 | MBTA bus: 9, 11 |
| South End | Herald Street | ● | ● | July 20, 2002 | MBTA bus: 9, 11 |
| Chinatown | Tufts Medical Center | ● | ● | July 20, 2002 | MBTA subway: Orange Line; MBTA bus: 11, 43 |
| Chinatown | Chinatown | ● | ● | July 20, 2002 | MBTA subway: Orange Line; MBTA bus: 11 |
| Downtown Boston | Downtown Crossing | | ● | July 20, 2002 | MBTA subway: Green Line, Orange Line, Red Line; MBTA bus: 43 |
| Downtown Boston | Boylston | | ● | July 20, 2002 | MBTA subway: Green Line; MBTA bus: 43 |
| Downtown Boston | South Station | ● | | October 13, 2009 | Amtrak: Acela, Lake Shore Limited, Northeast Regional; MBTA Commuter Rail: Fairmount Line, Fall River/New Bedford Line, Framingham/Worcester Line, Franklin/Foxboro Line, Greenbush Line, Kingston Line, Needham Line, Providence/Stoughton Line, CapeFLYER (seasonal); MBTA subway: Red Line, Silver Line (SL1, SL2, SL3, SLW); MBTA bus: 4, 7, 11; Intercity buses at South Station Bus Terminal |
| Chinatown | Chinatown Gate | ● | | August 19, 2022 | MBTA bus: 501, 504, 505 |

== History ==
=== Washington Street development ===
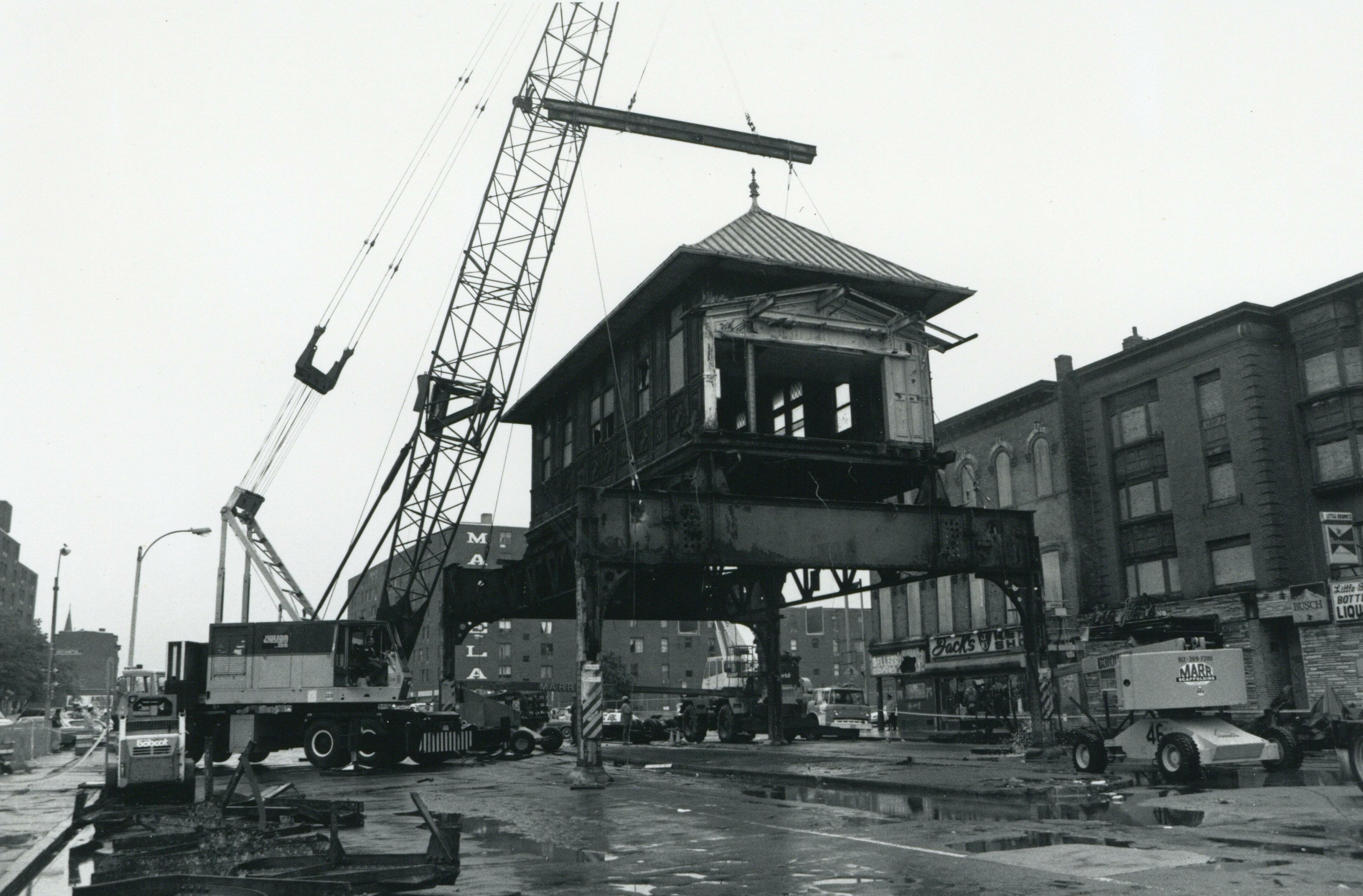
Removal of the Elevated in 1987

The 1947 state act that created the Metropolitan Transit Authority (MTA) from the Boston Elevated Railway established four immediate projects for the new agency: extension of rapid transit to Braintree, expansion of the Tremont Street Subway to four tracks, replacement of the existing elevated lines (Charlestown Elevated, Causeway Street Elevated, and Washington Street Elevated) with subways, and an extension of the Cambridge–Dorchester line northwest from Harvard. In 1948, the legislature authorized the city to issue $19 million in bonds (equivalent to $203 million in 2025) to construct an extension of the Washington Street Tunnel under Shawmut Street, connecting with the existing elevated south of Dudley Square. Although none of the proposals were built immediately, it established a precedent of replacing the elevated lines. In 1972, protests led to cancellation of the planned Southwest Expressway. Instead, the alignment was used for a combined corridor for intercity rail, commuter rail, and the Orange Line – replacing the Washington Street Elevated of the latter.

The northern part of the new corridor was about 1/2 mile (0.80 km) west of Washington Street, so the MBTA (which had replaced the MTA in 1964) began planning in 1978 for a replacement service between Dudley Square and Downtown Boston. By 1985, the MBTA favored bus or light rail service on Washington Street; the latter would have been a branch of the Green Line, operated through the 1962-abandoned southern branch. The Orange Line was rerouted in 1987; that year, the Urban Mass Transportation Administration rejected the MBTA's funding request to create a light rail line on the corridor. Local opinion favored the temporary retention of the northern portion of the Elevated until a permanent replacement could be built. However, the MBTA closed the Elevated and instead upgraded the route 49 bus from a feeder route to a more frequent trunk route.

The MBTA used this logo to advertise the Silver Line

In 1989, the MBTA announced that trolleybuses would be used on Washington Street, operating on 4-minute headways at peak hours. By 1990, the MBTA expected service to begin in 1993, with an underground connection to Boylston station and the proposed South Boston Piers tunnel in a future phase. After several more years of studies, the MBTA decided in 1996–97 to build the route as a bus rapid transit line using compressed natural gas (CNG) buses to avoid the visual impact of overhead wires. Environmental documentation was filed in 1998, and construction began in 2001. The project cost $27.3 million, with major elements including $10.9 million for the 17 new buses, $10.9 million for road work, and $2.6 million for shelters. Planning and construction were combined with a necessary repaving of Washington Street, reducing costs. Intended for the route to equal the service quality of light rail, the MBTA branded it as the "Silver Line" and designated it equally to the existing MBTA subway lines on maps. The Silver Line name was introduced in 1996.

The Silver Line followed largely the same route between Dudley Square and Downtown Boston as route 49; the primary change was the consolidation of stops. Although the MBTA considered other stop locations, most of the final stops were at existing route 49 stops. The conversion to the Silver Line occurred in several steps. In December 2001, the MBTA opened a contraflow bus-only lane on Washington Street between Marginal Road and East Berkeley Street, allowing southbound buses to use Washington Street. This eliminated a longer outbound routing via Surface Road, and allowed an extension to a new downtown terminal at Temple Place (between Park Street and Downtown Crossing stations). Service frequency was also increased at that time. On July 20, 2002, new Silver Line-branded CNG buses began operation – the first low-floor buses to operate in Boston – and the 20 stops were reduced to 11. In November 2002, a twelfth stop at Worcester Square was restored. The 40-foot (12 m) were replaced by 60-foot (18 m) buses in August 2003, and service frequency was again increased. On January 31, 2005, the route was the first MBTA bus route to receive new automated fare collection equipment. By 2005, ridership was double that of route 49, but early decreases in travel time were cancelled out by longer dwell times.

In February 2020, the MBTA agreed to change the name of Dudley Square station to Nubian, following the December 2019 renaming of the square itself. The station renaming took effect in June 2020. In May 2022, the MBTA released a draft plan for a systemwide network redesign. The draft called for the SL4 and SL5 to be combined into a single Nubian–South Station route to provide simpler and more consistent downtown service. The November 2022 draft network plan kept the same proposal. An additional SL4 stop (Chinatown Gate) on Surface Artery at Kneeland Street in Chinatown was added on August 19, 2022, while the Orange Line was closed for maintenance work; it was retained after the closure.

=== Waterfront development ===
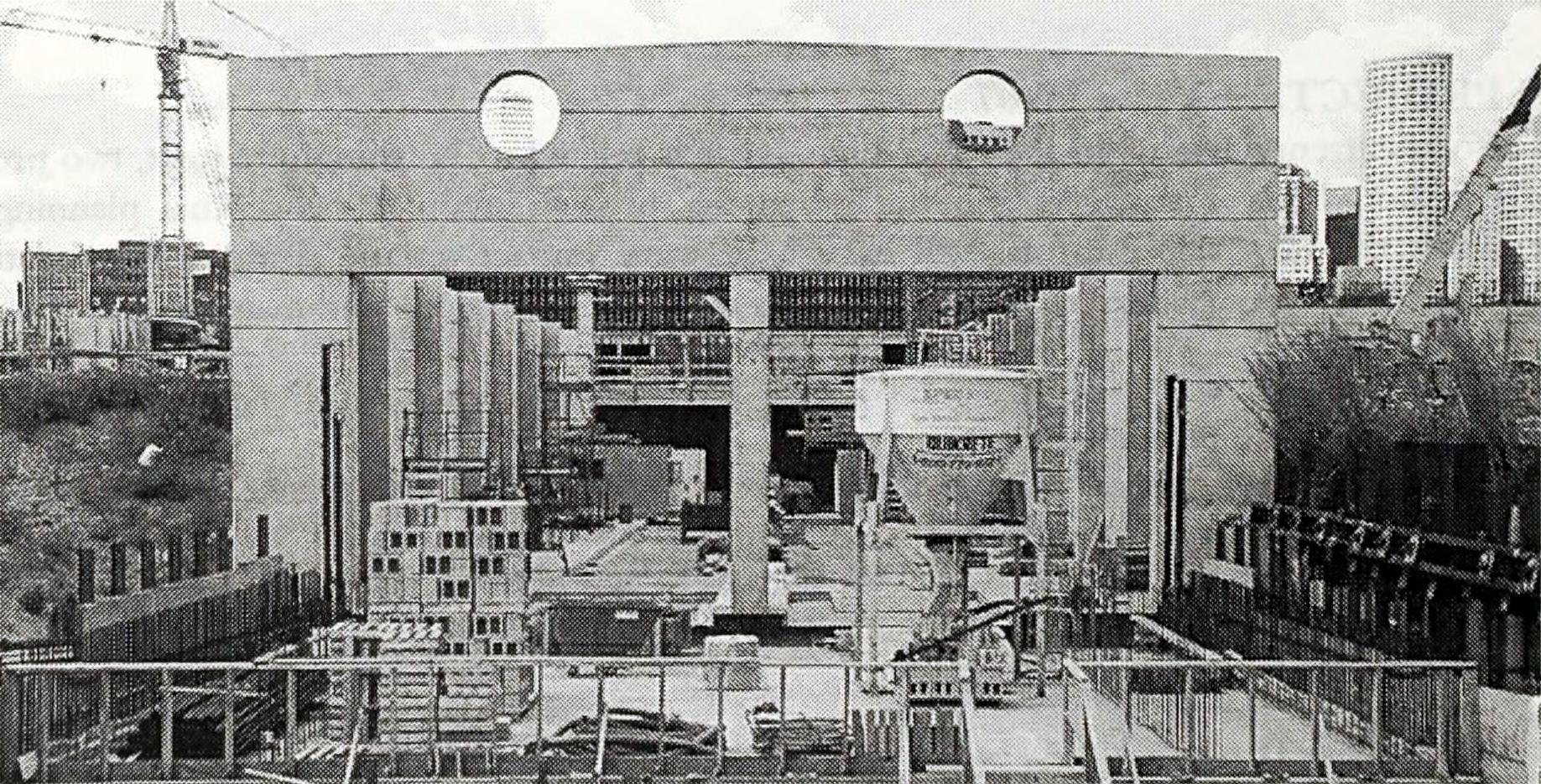
World Trade Center station under construction around 2002

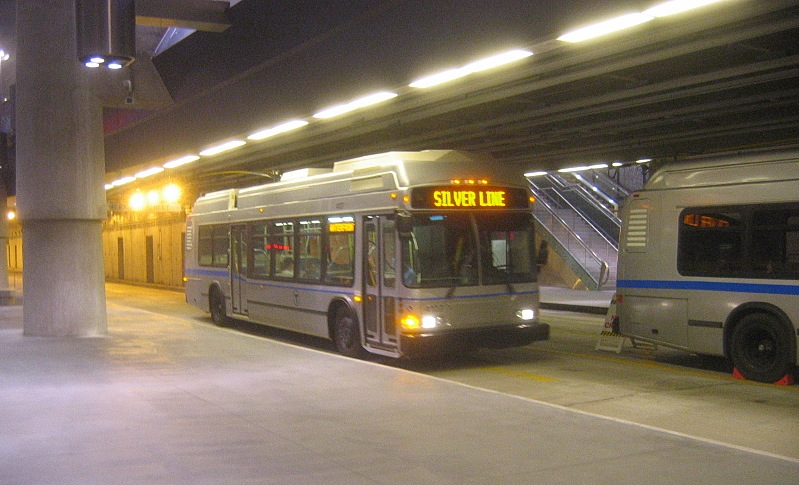
A 40-foot Silver Line trolleybus at Courthouse station in 2005. These buses were briefly used until the dual-mode buses entered service.

For most of the 20th century, the Seaport District was an industrial area occupied by rail yards and wharves; the South Boston Army Base and South Boston Naval Annex were served by short bus routes that connected with the Red Line at South Station. After the military bases closed in 1974 and the rail yards were no longer needed, the Seaport was designated for commercial development, with accompanying need for expanded transit. The MBTA conducted a feasibility study in 1987 and released a Draft Environmental Impact Report (DEIR) in 1989. The DEIR selected an underground "transitway" over alternatives including a surface light rail line, an elevated people mover, a commuter rail shuttle, and a relocation of the Red Line. The transitway was to use trolleybuses or dual-mode buses, rather than the light rail and people mover possibilities considered; it would connect with the Red Line at South Station, the Orange Line at Chinatown, and the Green Line at Boylston. Costs could be reduced by combining its construction with the upcoming Central Artery/Tunnel Project ("Big Dig"). Service from the transitway could be extended to serve Logan International Airport, to form part of a proposed circumferential transit line, and to connect with the planned Washington Street service.

The South Boston Piers Transitway alignment was refined by a supplemental DEIR in 1992. The Final Environmental Impact Statement/Final Environmental Impact Report (FEIS/FEIR) was approved in December 1993. The South Station–Seaport segment was to open in 2000, with the Boylston segment opening in 2006. The stations at World Trade Center, Courthouse, South Station, Chinatown, and Boylston would each have island platforms, and the tunnel could be later converted to light rail as a Green Line branch if needed. Daily ridership was expected to be between 24,200 and 37,200 for the first phase, and between 34,800 and 69,800 for the full build, depending on the rate of commercial development. In November 1994, the Federal Transit Administration (FTA) agreed to fund $331 million (80%) of the $413 million first phase, which was to be completed in December 2000. The environmental approval process was completed in April 1995.

In 1997, with construction on the transitway already under way, Massport cancelled a planned people mover at Logan Airport in favor of dual-mode buses operating from the transitway and through the newly-opened Ted Williams Tunnel. (Note: Such use of the third harbor tunnel to run express bus service to the airport had been proposed as early as 1968.) A connector road was to extend the transitway from D Street to Haul Road. These changes were approved in February 1998. In May 1999, the MBTA indicated plans to through-route the transitway with the planned Washington Street service as the "Silver Line", with the Washington Street service as Phase I, the initial Transitway build as Phase II, and the Boylston extension as Phase III.

Initial construction of the Transitway was divided into four main sections: South Station and turnaround loop plus 1,550 feet (470 m) of tunnel ($96 million), Russia Wharf and Fort Point Channel tunnel ($128 million), Courthouse station plus 1,450 feet (440 m) of tunnel ($110 million), and World Trade Center station plus 1,200 feet (370 m) of tunnel ($43 million). The Russia Wharf section, using the New Austrian tunnelling method, was the most technically complex; ground freezing was required to support the historic Russia Wharf Buildings. It also included an immersed tube under the Fort Point Channel. The discovery of a massive boulder under the Channel delayed the project by a year. By late 2000, the project was three years behind schedule and almost $200 million over budget; the MBTA diverted $150 million of other federal grants and $50 million of contingency funds to cover the costs. The Transitway was ultimately completed in 2004, with a final cost to the MBTA of $624 million. (Note: That figure includes the higher-than-expected cost of dual-mode buses, and part of the cost of the Southampton maintenance facility, but subtracts reimbursements from other projects.) Although some projects like the new federal courthouse and the new convention center had been built, commercial development had lagged early plans; the MBTA adjusted its 2006 daily ridership projections from 45,000 to 14,000 shortly before opening.

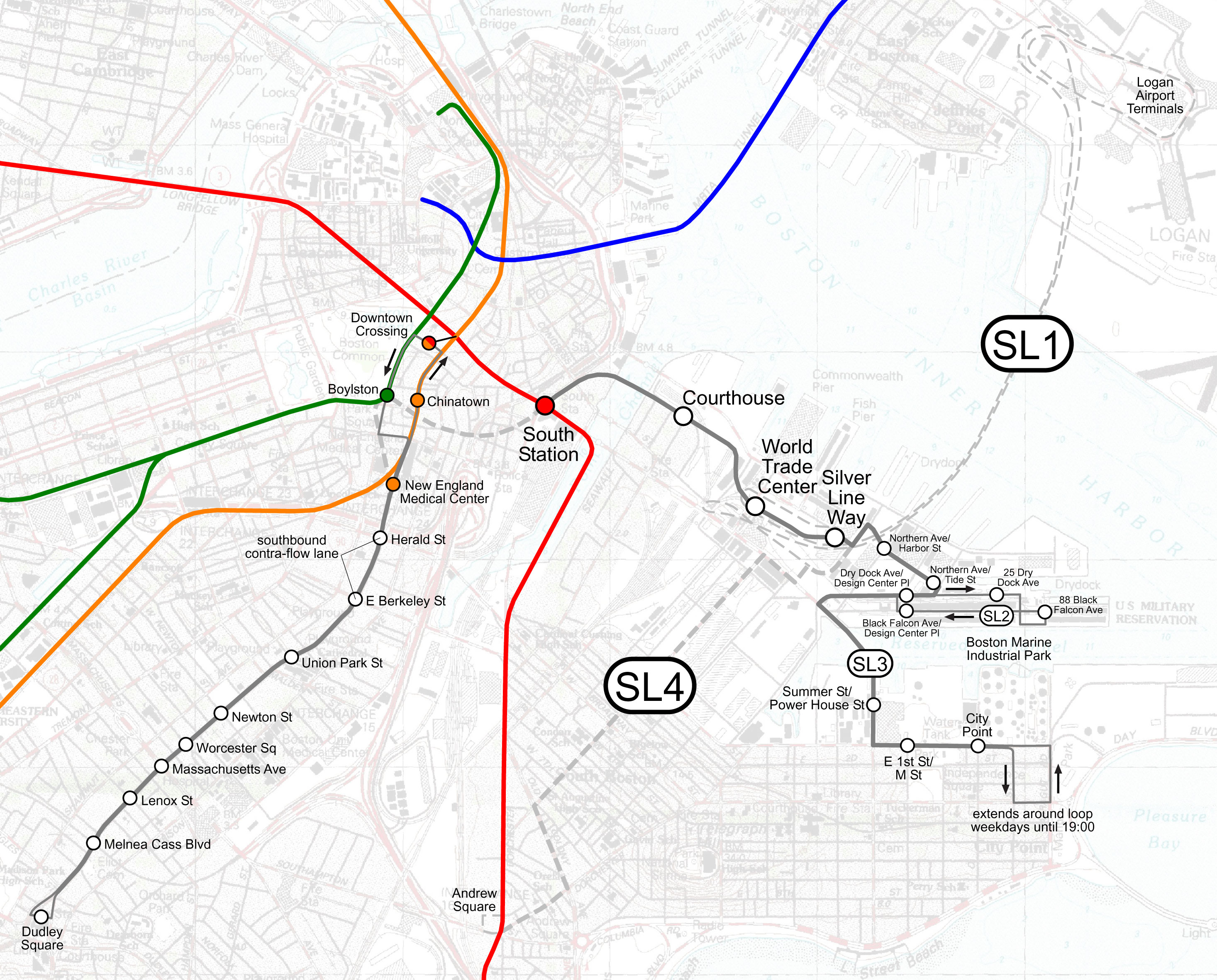
Silver Line service plans as of 2005, showing the SL3 (discontinued in 2009) and the original SL4 and Phase III (never implemented)

The Transitway opened on December 17, 2004, with the Waterfront shuttle route between South Station and Silver Line operated by a mix of new dual-mode buses and 40-foot (12 m) trolleybuses borrowed from the Harvard-based routes. It was only the third "urban trolleybus subway" (tunnel with stations) in the world, after the Harvard bus tunnel and the Downtown Seattle Transit Tunnel (in which trolleybus service ended in 2005). Original plans called for a single South Boston route running to City Point via D Street, Broadway, Summer Street, and E 1st Street. After concerns from residents over reduction of legal parking spaces and impacts to the "local custom" of double parking, this was split into two routes: one running to Andrew via D Street, and one to City Point via E 1st Street. Until shortly before the routes opened, the MBTA planned to distinguish them with letters like the Green Line branches, rather than the numbers that were ultimately used.

On December 31, 2004, service began on routes SL2 to the Boston Marine Industrial Park and route SL3 to City Point – the latter running via Northern Avenue, Drydock Avenue, and Summer Street. Two days later, a Sunday-only Silver Line Way-Logan Airport shuttle service called "Silver Line Connector" began operation to meet a legal commitment to begin airport service that month. The existing surface routes in the Seaport were discontinued or rerouted in January. Due to a lack of available dual-mode buses, CNG shuttles operated on the surface sections of the SL2 and SL3 routes from January 5 to March 14, 2005. On March 26, the two routes were combined on nights and weekends. On April 9, weekday SL3 service was extended from City Point to a loop on Farragut Road. On May 28, 2005, the two routes were combined at all times as the SL2/3. This freed up buses for SL1 service to Logan Airport, which began on June 1. As more buses entered service, the SL2 and SL3 were re-split into separate routes (except nights and weekends) on August 20, and the Farragut Road loop was cut due to noise complaints from residents. On October 15, City Point service was cut on nights and weekends. The planned SL4 route to Andrew, expected to begin service in 2005, was never implemented.

As enough dual-mode buses became available, the borrowed 40-foot trolleybuses were phased out; they were last used on February 12, 2006. By 2006, the Silver Line had doubled transit ridership to the Seaport, and increased transit ridership to Logan by 24%. The SL3 service was never successful, as the parallel route 7 had a more direct routing, lower fares, and better downtown connections. By 2008, the SL3 averaged less than one passenger per trip on the segment not shared with the SL2. On March 20, 2009, SL3 service was cut, with SL2 service increased in its stead. In October 2009, the SL2 terminus was renamed "Design Center" with no changes in service.

Until 2019, SL2 buses served the Design Center loop in two different patterns. Before noon, outbound buses proceeded around the whole loop, laid over at the Design Center stop, then proceeded inbound. After noon, outbound buses made a shorter western loop, laid over at Design Center, then proceeded inbound via the main loop. On December 22, 2019, the route was changed so that buses proceeded around the whole loop before the layover at all times. On March 15, 2020, afternoon service began laying over at 23 Dry Dock Avenue before making the loop.

In January 2021, Massport approved a ground lease agreement for air rights development over Silver Line Way station, which will include improvements to the stop. On March 13, 2022, all SL2 buses began laying over at 23 Dry Dock Avenue. The stop at 88 Black Falcon Avenue, closed since April 2019 due to pier repairs, was permanently cut at that time. An improved stop on the east side of 27 Drydock Avenue (at Black Falcon Avenue) is planned by 2025 as part of redevelopment of 88 Black Falcon Avenue. The May 2022 draft network plan called for routes SL1 and SL3 to use D Street to more directly access the Ted Williams Tunnel, with only route SL2 plus SLW shuttles serving Silver Line Way. The November 2022 revised proposal kept this change, with SL2 enhanced to higher frequency service all days. SL2 service began operating every 15 minutes or better at all operating hours effective April 5, 2026.

=== Phase III plans ===
Silver Line Phase III alternatives, showing the original 4 alignments plus the Charles Street Modified (CSM) alignment. The preferred route at the time of the project's cancellation was the CSM alignment (pink) feeding into the core tunnel (green).

The Boylston extension, as planned in 1993, would have run west from South Station under Essex Street, Avenue de Lafayette, and Avery Street. The Chinatown platform would have been under Hayward Place east of Washington Street, and the Boylston platform under the existing Green Line station, with a turnaround loop under Boylston Street and the Central Burying Ground. The 1999 decision to combine the Waterfront and Washington Street projects as the Silver Line resulted in the addition of a southern segment, likely using the same abandoned streetcar tunnel as had been proposed a decade before. A new underground station would have been built under Tremont Street, connecting to the existing New England Medical Center (NEMC) station, with a portal to Washington Street just north of Oak Street. In April 2000, the MBTA adjusted the alignment to use Boylston Street instead of Avenue de Lafayette and Avery Street, with side platforms at the stations. The new alignment would conflict less with development, provide a straighter route, avoid the need for a pedestrian crossing and a lengthy pedestrian tunnel at Chinatown, and move the Boylston loop away from the Burying Ground.

In January 2002, the MBTA began seeking federal funding for 60% of the project cost. The FTA approved the project for further planning that July. The Boston Regional Metropolitan Planning Organization rated the project as "high priority" in its May 2003 Program for Mass Transportation, citing its high estimated ridership, low operating cost and service to environmental justice neighborhoods. In 2003, the preferred portal location was moved slightly north to avoid the need to demolish the YMCA building, and the NEMC station was removed. A proposal to consolidate the Chinatown and Boylston stations was rejected due to steep grades required and lack of cost savings, and a proposal to eliminate the loop was rejected because of the need to short turn most buses at Boylston. Further changes in 2003–04 were caused by the need to add a second platform at Boylston due to high expected ridership, and to reduce impacts to the historic Boston Common from the loop. One alternative placed the station and loop under Tremont Street south of Boylston Street; the other enlarged them under the Common.

Continued concerns about the Common, concerns from Bay Village residents about impacts to Eliot Norton Park, and desires to add Back Bay service resulted in further changes in 2004–05. The platforms at Boylston were to be aligned east–west under Boylston Street west of Tremont Street, with the loop further to the west at Charles Street. New portal alignments were considered, including one on Columbus Avenue to the southwest. Capital cost was originally estimated at $768–812 million depending on the portal location; completion was moved from 2010 to 2013. Daily ridership for the completed Silver Line system was estimated to reach 160,000 by 2025. In August 2005, the MBTA put the Phase III project "on hold" in order to build community consensus on a locally preferred routing.

In February 2006, State Transportation Secretary John Cogliano proposed a $94 million plan that would eliminate most of the tunneling and cost of the original proposal while still connecting the two phases of the service. Under Cogliano's plan, the Silver Line would run on the surface via Kneeland Street and Surface Road to a new tunnel portal on Essex Street near South Station. A fare-controlled shelter would be added at Downtown Crossing for routes still terminating there. The plan also included expansion of surface Silver Line service, with a new branch running from Copley Square into the Essex Street portal to provide a one-seat ride from the Back Bay area. The southern branch would be extended from Dudley to the Red Line stations at Mattapan via Blue Hill Avenue (replacing route 28) and Ashmont via Washington Street (replacing route 23) The plan was popular with Bay Village residents who had been worried about the full-length tunnel, but attracted criticism because it would not substantially speed travel times to downtown.

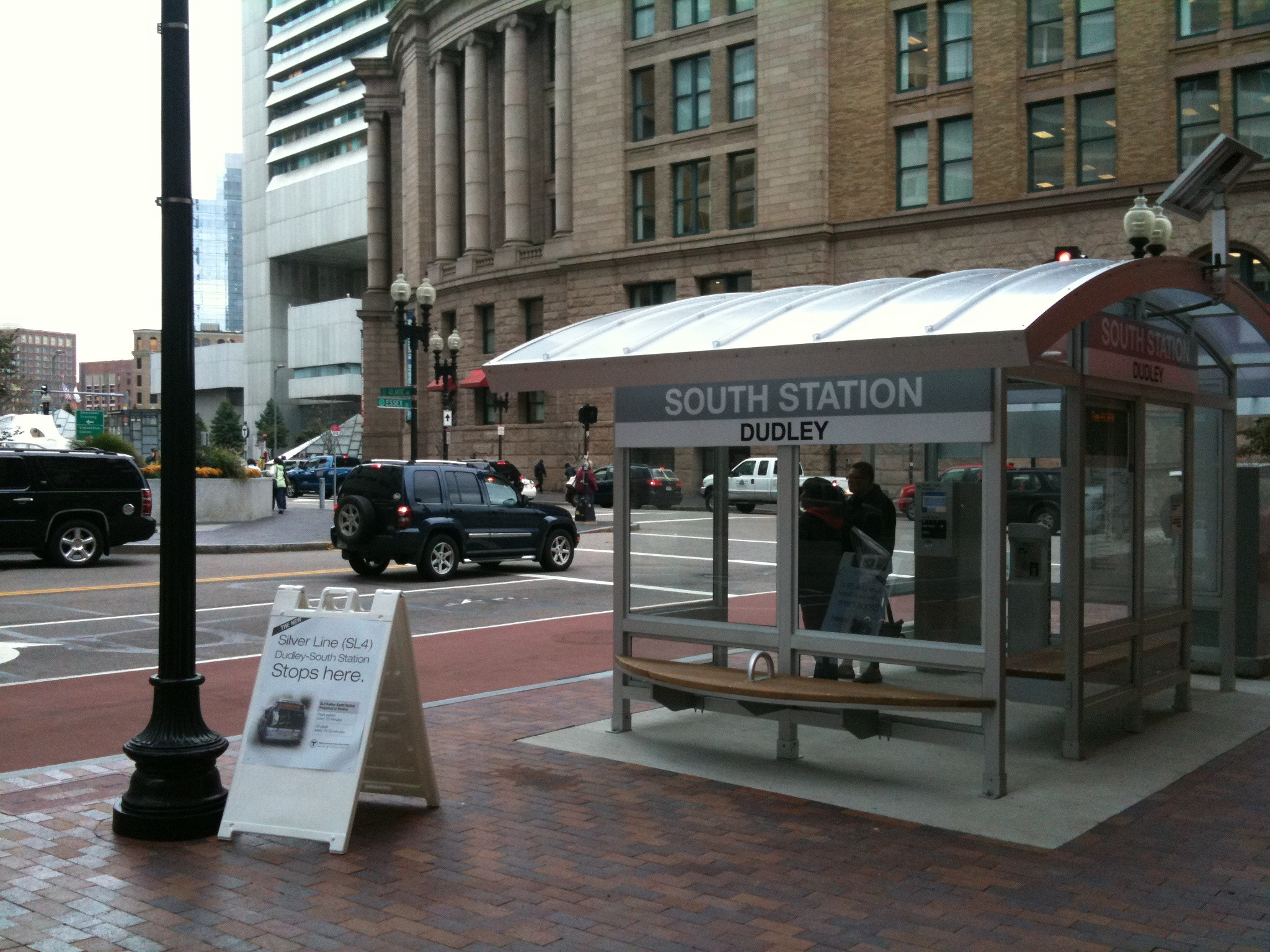
Shelter at South Station for route SL4

A revised tunnel plan was put forward in March 2006, with support from most transportation leaders including Cogliano. The plan involved a variation of the Charles Street tunnel alignment, with the portal moved southwest onto Tremont Street near Marginal Road. This "Charles Street Modified" alignment remained the preferred alternative for the remainder of the project. Contra-flow dedicated bus lanes, already in place on Washington Street, were to be extended onto Marginal Road and Herald Street to allow buses to reach the portal from the surface section. On December 12, 2006, the FTA approved the project to re-enter its funding process. By mid-2008, environmental review and preliminary engineering were expected to be completed by the end of the year, with federal funding sought in 2010 and construction lasting from 2011 to a 2016 opening.

However, the estimated price of the tunnel plan, dubbed the "Little Dig", had risen to $2.1 billion by May 2009. The FTA assigned it a Medium Low overall rating, making it ineligible to move into the final design phase for federal New Starts funding. The Boston Region Metropolitan Planning Organization removed Phase III from the list of recommended projects in its long range plan because of funding limitations. Concluding that it could not successfully compete for more than one New Starts grant, the Massachusetts Department of Transportation (MassDOT) informed the FTA that it was no longer seeking New Starts money for Phase III. All New Starts funds available would instead be directed to the legally mandated Green Line Extension project. In a July 2010 report, the MBTA declared that Phase III was on indefinite hold and no further funds would be spent on the project.

A partial solution that did not require a new tunnel opened on October 13, 2009, after expedited construction using federal stimulus money. The new route, SL4, covered much of the same alignment as the proposed Phase III, with a dedicated bus lane on Essex Street and a South Station stop west of Atlantic Avenue. The existing Downtown Crossing-Dudley route was renamed SL5 at that time.

=== Extension to Chelsea ===
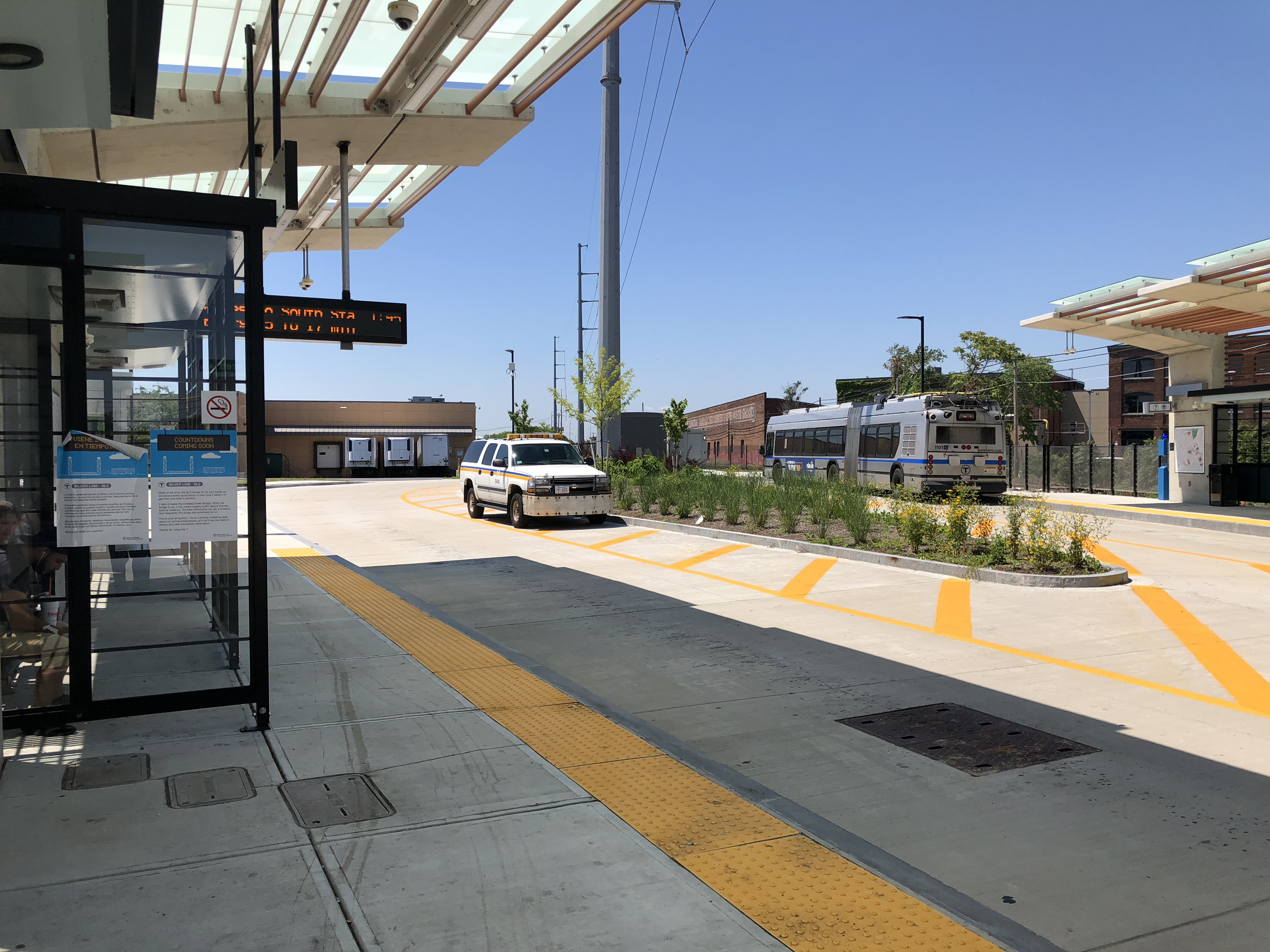
Chelsea station in July 2018

The Urban Ring Project was a planned circumferential surface BRT line. It would have shared the Silver Line berths at Dudley Square, and have had a surface stop outside World Trade Center station, but otherwise would have been separate from the Silver Line. The project was cancelled in 2010 due to high cost, but planning for several smaller sections continued. The Chelsea–South Boston section was given high priority because Chelsea was densely populated yet underserved by transit. MassDOT had also purchased the Grand Junction Branch – including abandoned sections in Chelsea and East Boston – from CSX Transportation in 2010, meaning that a potential right-of-way (which the Urban Ring had proposed to use) was available. A state study in 2011 analyzed potential Chelsea services, including a Silver Line branch to Bellingham Square or the Chelsea commuter rail station, or improvements to the route 112 bus.

In 2013, MassDOT began public planning of the Silver Line Gateway project. In addition to serving Chelsea, the proposed line would provide Blue Line riders a direct connection to the Seaport and South Station. Three possible alignments were studied. All used the Transitway and the Ted Williams Tunnel to reach Airport station, then the 2012-opened Coughlin Bypass Road to the Chelsea Street Bridge. The first alignment was to run entirely on a new busway on the Grand Junction right-of-way in Chelsea, with stops at Eastern Avenue, Box District, Bellingham Square at the Chelsea commuter rail station, and Mystic Mall. The second alignment option would have followed the Grand Junction to just short of the commuter rail station, then diverge onto surface roads to Bellingham Square, while the third alignment would have run entirely on surface streets, serving two stops on Central Avenue and four stops along a loop serving Chelsea station and the MGH Chelsea healthcare center.

In September 2013, the MBTA indicated that it would pursue the first alternative, with an estimated daily ridership of 8,700, despite potential issues with bridge clearances and rebuilding the commuter rail station. On October 30, 2013, MassDOT announced $82.5 million in state funding for the new Silver Line route to Chelsea, with completion expected in 2015. The announcement also included the relocation of the commuter rail station to Chelsea (Mystic Mall) and a $3 million, 3/4-mile (1.2 km) multi-use path from Eastern Avenue to Washington Street. The Environmental Impact Report was issued in March 2014. MassDOT awarded a $33.8 million construction contract for the first phase of the project on September 17, 2014. That phase included the 1.3-mile (2.1 km)-long busway, the four Silver Line stations, replacement of the Washington Street bridge, and the Chelsea Greenway.

Silver Line service to Chelsea (route SL3) began on April 21, 2018. By October, daily ridership reached 6,200. The second phase of the project includes the relocated Chelsea commuter rail station plus transit signal priority upgrades for the SL3. Construction began in August 2019; the new station opened on November 15, 2021. As of January 2024, the MBTA and the City of Boston planned to reconfigure Day Square in East Boston in late 2024. The project would include bus lanes on Chelsea Street and a bus-only street through Day Square, with a Day Square station for use by the SL3 and local bus routes.

=== Sullivan Square extension ===
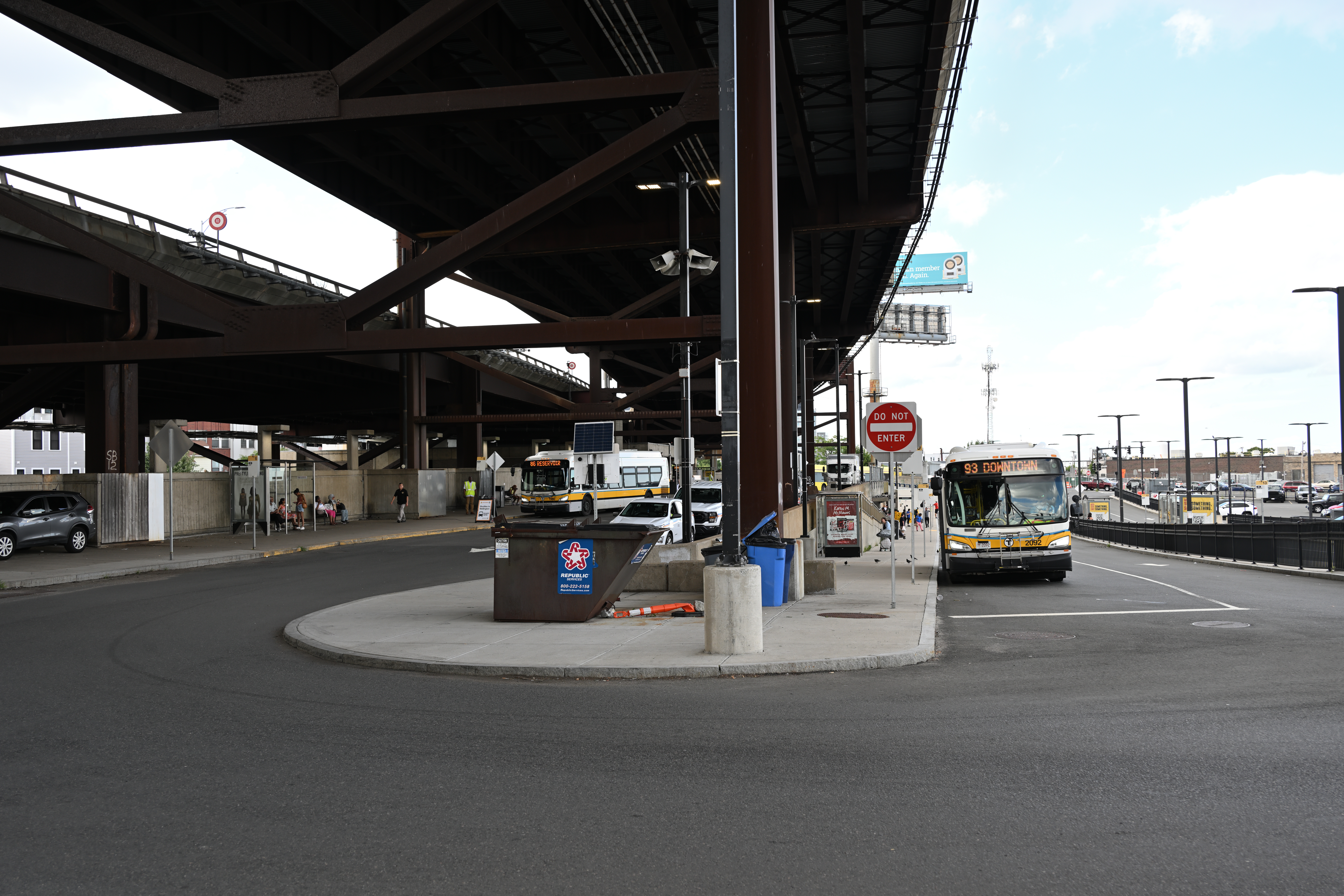
Sullivan Square station, the proposed terminal of the extension

In March 2019, state and local officials indicated plans to extend service from Chelsea on two routes to Kendall Square and to North Station, both via Sullivan Square. The routes would primarily use dedicated busways and bus lanes, although it was not decided whether they would be under the Silver Line brand. In January 2021, the MBTA and MassDOT began work on the Silver Line Extension (SLX), which would look into route alternatives from Chelsea into Everett, Somerville, Cambridge, and Boston. Six potential corridors were identified by September 2021: to Wellington, to Sullivan, to Malden Center, to downtown Boston via Sullivan, to Kendall Square via Sullivan, and to Kendall Square via Wellington. Some corridors could be operated as new routes independent from the SL3, with Chelsea or Airport as potential termini rather than South Station.

Alternatives were presented in September 2022. Three potential SL3 extensions would run to Malden Center, Wellington, or Sullivan – all via Everett Square, with varying amounts of dedicated bus lanes on the western portion. Four potential SL6 routes were identified: Everett (Glendale Square)–Kendall via McGrath Highway, Everett–Kendall via the Gilmore Bridge, Everett–Haymarket via Rutherford Avenue, and Eastern Avenue–Kendall via Everett Square. All of the potential SL6 routes would operate primarily in dedicated lanes. A SL3 extension to Sullivan was announced as the preferred alternative in March 2024; the study recommended that SL6 planning be deferred pending related planning efforts for Sullivan Square, Rutherford Avenue, the Gilmore Bridge, and Kendall Square, as well as implementation of the planned bus network redesign.

The proposed SL3 extension would run in an off-street busway west to 2nd Street, mixed traffic (possibly later dedicated lanes) on 2nd Street and Spring Street, and dedicated lanes on Chelsea Street and most of Broadway. South of Sweetser Circle, a dedicated busway would be built on Lower Broadway. New stops would be located on 2nd Street at Boston Street and Spring Street; on Broadway at Chelsea Street (Everett Square), Beacham Street, and Horizon Way; and at Sullivan Square station. The extension would add 6.36 miles (10.24 km) of round trip distance, with 5.18 miles (8.34 km) – 80% – in dedicated bus lanes. It was estimated to increase SL3 ridership by 15,000 daily boardings by 2040, with a capital cost of $95 million.

In June 2024, the MBTA was awarded a $22.4 million federal grant for reconstruction of the Lower Broadway segment for existing bus routes and eventual Silver Line service. Conceptual plans for the Sullivan Square–Sweetser Circle section released in March 2026 called for a bidirectional busway on the north side of Broadway/Alford Street with three stops located at Bartlett Street, Thorndike Street, and Dexter Street. Northbound buses would operate in mixed traffic from Beacham Street to Sweetser Circle.

=== Other proposed corridors ===
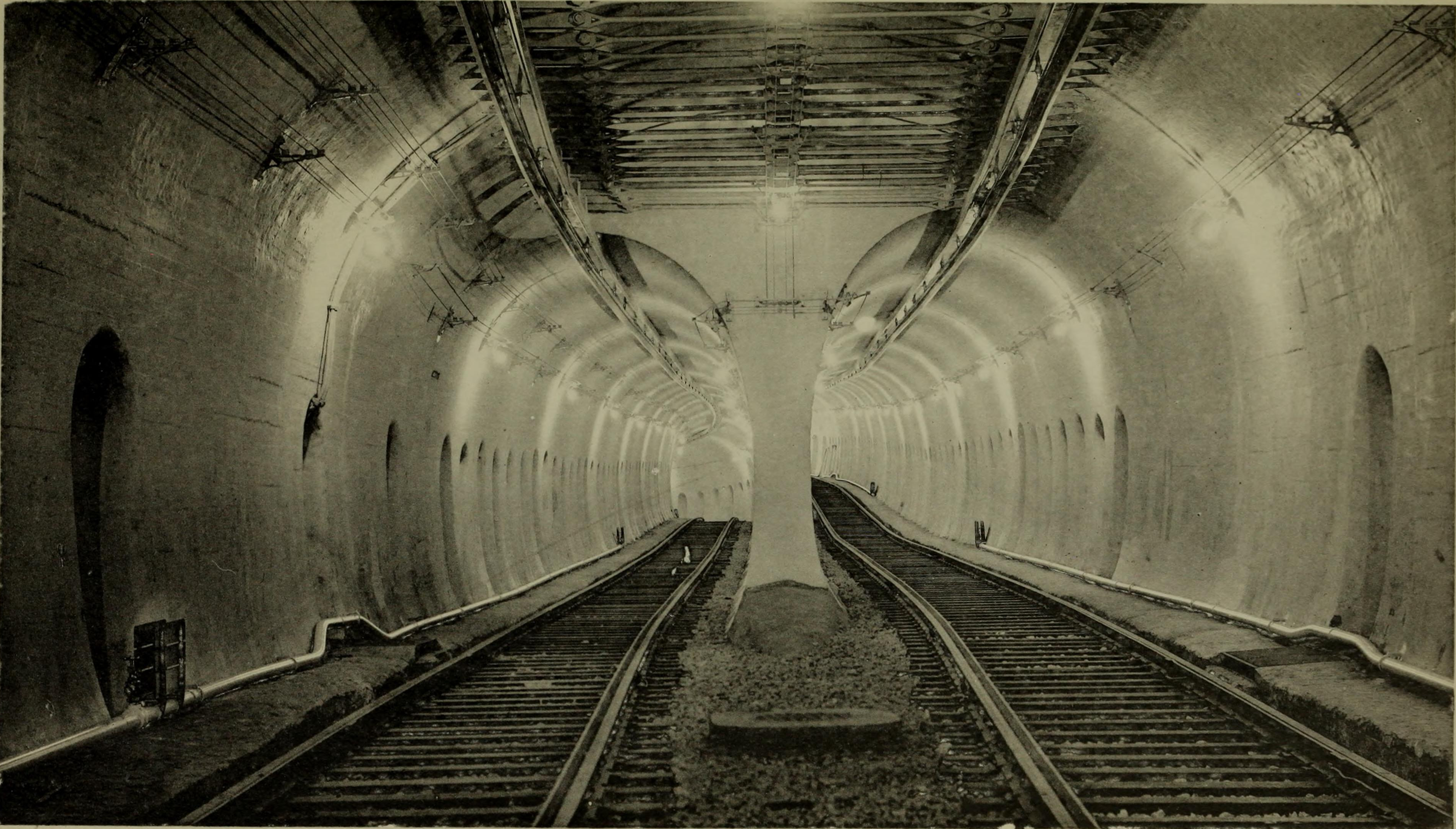
Southern branch of the Tremont Street subway near the former Pleasant Street portal. This tunnel was briefly considered for use in the Phase III tunnel and is the likely connecting route for a proposed conversion of the Washington Street section of the Silver Line to a branch of the Green Line.

Several other bus rapid transit and express bus projects have been proposed in Boston, many under the Silver Line banner. The first two phases of the 2010-cancelled Urban Ring Project were to be BRT, with light or heavy rail for the final phase. The Urban Ring was considered a separate project, although it would have shared the SL1 route between Silver Line Way and Logan Airport.

A number of Silver Line expansion corridors were considered in the 2003 Program for Mass Transportation (PMT); most were given brief consideration but not acted upon. One, a BRT express overlay for the route 28 bus (which runs between Ruggles station and Mattapan via Nubian), was revived in 2006 as part of the Phase III plans. In 2009, the state proposed to replace the 28 bus entirely with a BRT route called 28X, including the installation of dedicated bus lanes, bus signal priority, and on-platform fare collection. However, the proposal was withdrawn in 2010 due to local opposition, both to the design of the route and because the plan had been made without consulting local officials. Subsequent planning for bus improvements on Blue Hill Avenue has occurred without Silver Line branding.

Several other corridors were considered in the 2003 PMT. These included a Dudley–Ashmont route replacing the route 23 bus (also revived in 2006 in Phase III planning, but not during the 28X proposal), as well as a new BRT tunnel to Kenmore with surface branches to the Longwood Medical Area via Brookline Avenue and Allston via Commonwealth Avenue, the Mass Pike, and Cambridge Street. The City of Boston proposed an alternate western Silver Line branch using buses along the Mass Pike without a new tunnel, similar to existing express buses.

The 2003 PMT included the possibility of converting the Washington Street section of the Silver Line to light rail (as had originally been promised) using the abandoned southern section of the Tremont Street Subway. The project was estimated to cost $374 million; ridership was estimated to be 34,000 daily riders almost entirely diverted from the Silver Line service. The project was given low priority, with the Phase III tunnel recommended instead. In 2012, the Roxbury–Dorchester–Mattapan Transit Needs Study recommended the conversion to light rail as a long-term project, with the additional possibility of extending the line down Blue Hill Avenue to Mattapan along the route 28 bus corridor.

== Service ==
=== Frequency and ridership ===
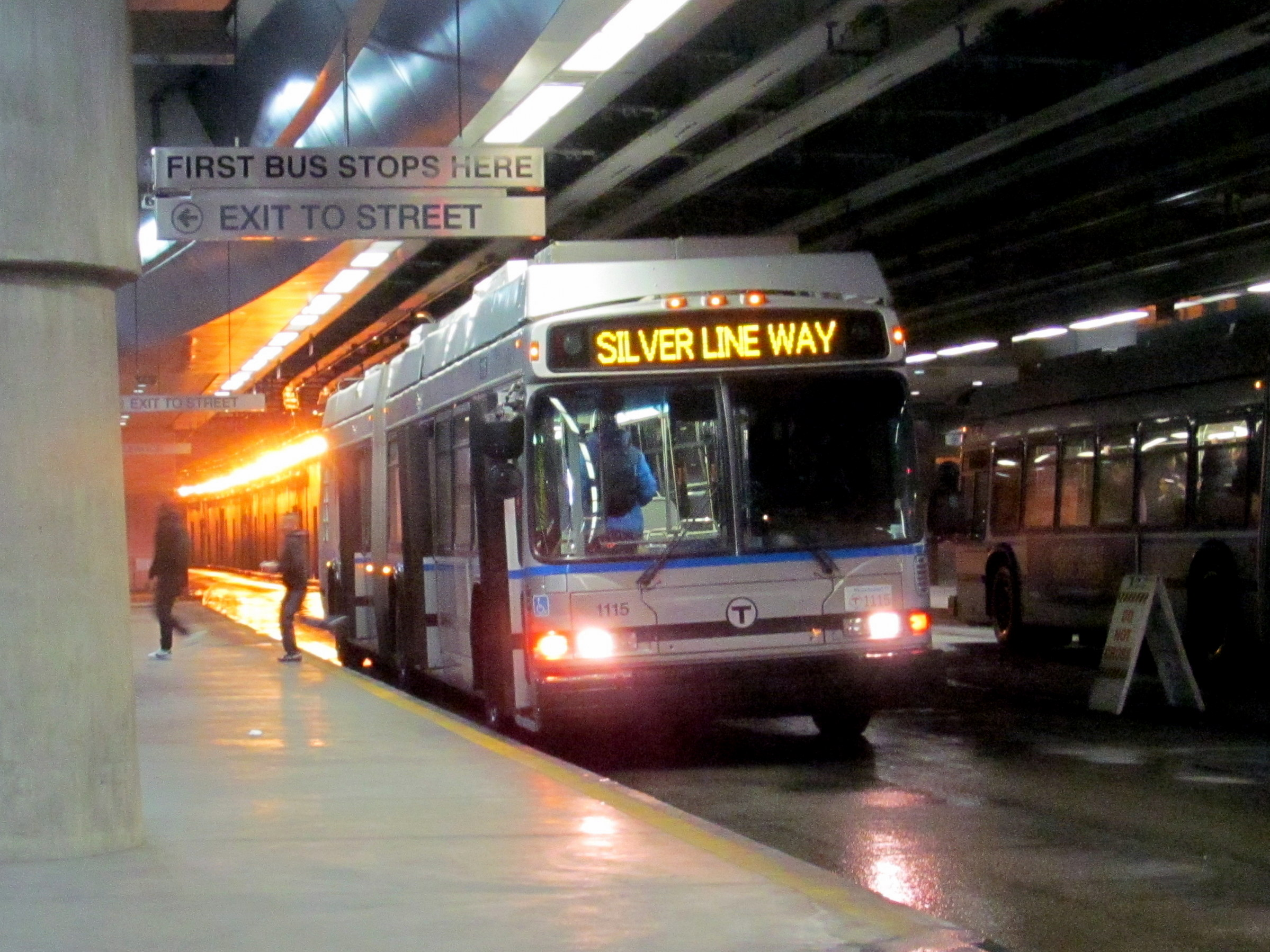
The SLW was one of three MBTA bus routes to show a net profit in a 2012 study.

The Silver Line routes are among the most frequent MBTA bus routes. All routes (except for the SLW shuttle) run at least every 15 minutes during all service hours, save for late evening and weekend service on the SL4. At peak hours, combined frequency on the trunk sections is about 30 buses per hour (2 minute headways) in each direction in the Transitway, and 12 buses per hour (5 minute headways) on Washington Street. The routes have high ridership (though lower than many key bus routes) and low costs per rider compared to other bus routes in the MBTA system. In 2012, three routes (SL1, SL5, SLW) were the only MBTA bus routes to show a profit; the median net cost (after fares) on all MBTA bus routes was $2.13 per passenger. In 2026, combined weekday ridership on Silver Line routes was 37,905. Effective December 14, 2025, routes SL1, SL3, and SL5 is scheduled to operate every 15 minutes or less during normal service hours.

In addition to the public route name, the Silver Line and crosstown routes have internal route numbers in the 700 series. The SL5 is designated 749 after the 49 bus it replaced, while the other routes have similar numbers.

| Route | # | Rush hour headways | Midday headways | Weekend headways | Weekday ridership (2018) |
|---|---|---|---|---|---|
| SL1 | 741 | 10–12 minutes | 12 minutes | 8–12 minutes | 8,132 |
| SL2 | 742 | 5–8 minutes | 15 minutes | 15 minutes | 6,420 |
| SL3 | 743 | 10 minutes | 15 minutes | 12–15 minutes | 6,200 |
| SLW | 746 | 8 minutes | — | Limited service | (not available) |
| SL4 | 751 | 12 minutes | 14 minutes | 16–17 minutes | 5,800 |
| SL5 | 749 | 8–9 minutes | 8–11 minutes | 8–9 minutes | 10,300 |

=== Criticism ===
==== Mode choice ====
This is not bus rapid transit. All they did was take a diesel bus, change the engine, paint it silver and run it down the street through traffic.

— Roxbury activist Bob Terrell

When the Washington Street Elevated was replaced with the Southwest Corridor, MBTA promised "equal or better" surface transit on Washington Street to replace the Elevated. Riders supported light rail; the decision to instead run buses was viewed as a broken promise and intentional disinvestment. The Silver Line is substantially slower than the Elevated, with travel time from Nubian Square to Downtown Boston increased from 8 minutes to 20 minutes. The Washington Street corridor population is poorer and less educated than the Southwest Corridor, and has a larger Black population; advocates including state representative Gloria Fox have called the poor service on the Silver Line "discrimination against people of color". Because of the poor service and the perception that the bus service was an inferior substitute for the originally-planned light rail line, advocates nicknamed the Washington Street service as the "Silver Lie".

Two theoretical advantages of BRT compared to light rail are low cost and speedy implementation. However, Silver Line service did not begin on Washington Street until 15 years after the Elevated came down; the first phase of the Transitway opened 15 years after the DEIR, and the second phase was never completed. The Transitway was built at "enormous cost"; it was the most expensive single BRT project in the world by a 2007 report. Like the Downtown Seattle Transit Tunnel (which was later converted to light rail), the Transitway had comparable construction cost to light rail, but a lower level of service. At the time of its cancellation, Phase III was expected to cost $2.1 billion - more than three times that of the Transitway. Although transit ridership in the Seaport doubled after the introduction of the Silver Line, that growth is due partially to commercial development rather than the service quality.

==== BRT quality ====
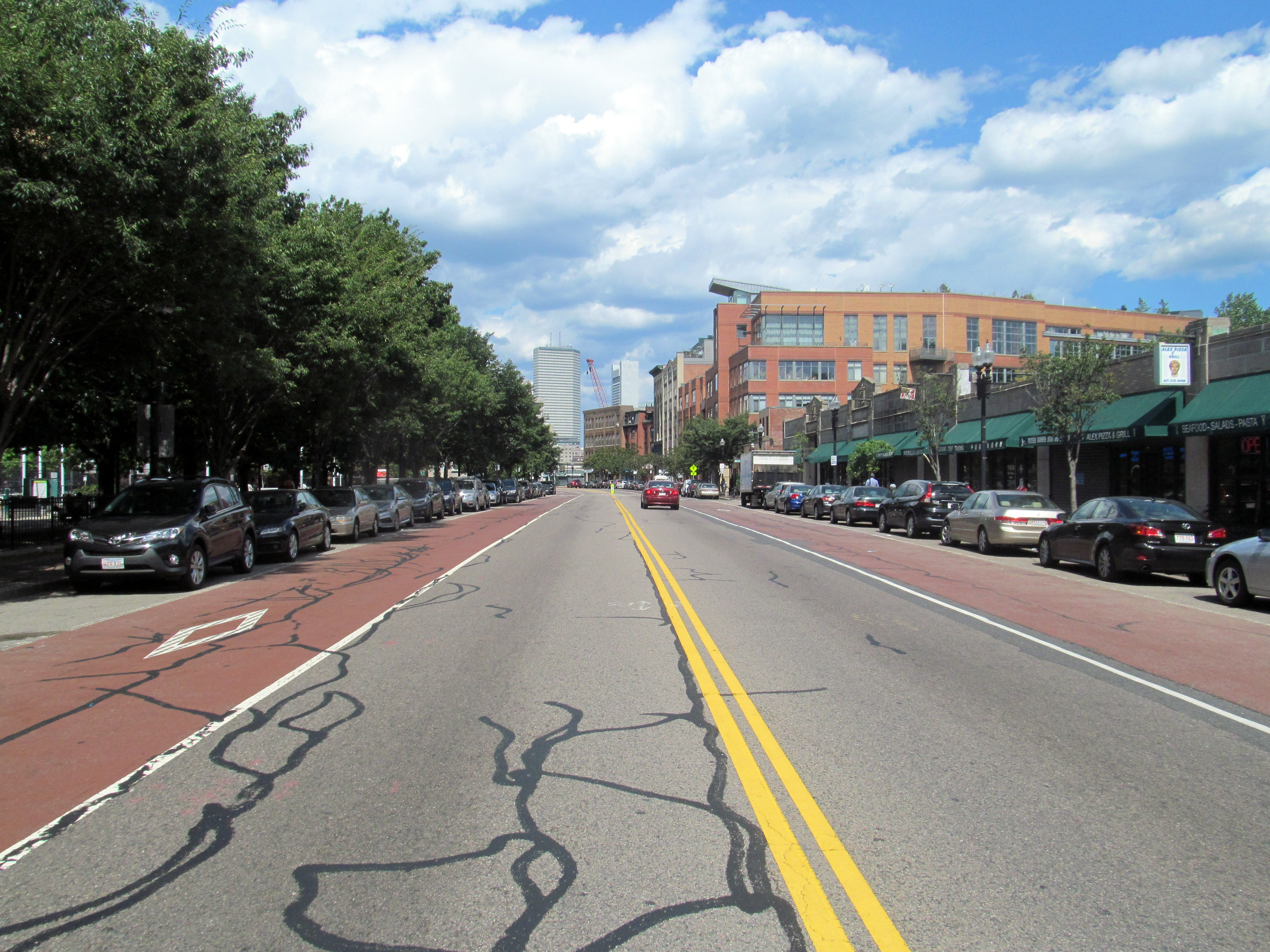
Red-painted bus lanes on an uncongested section of Washington Street

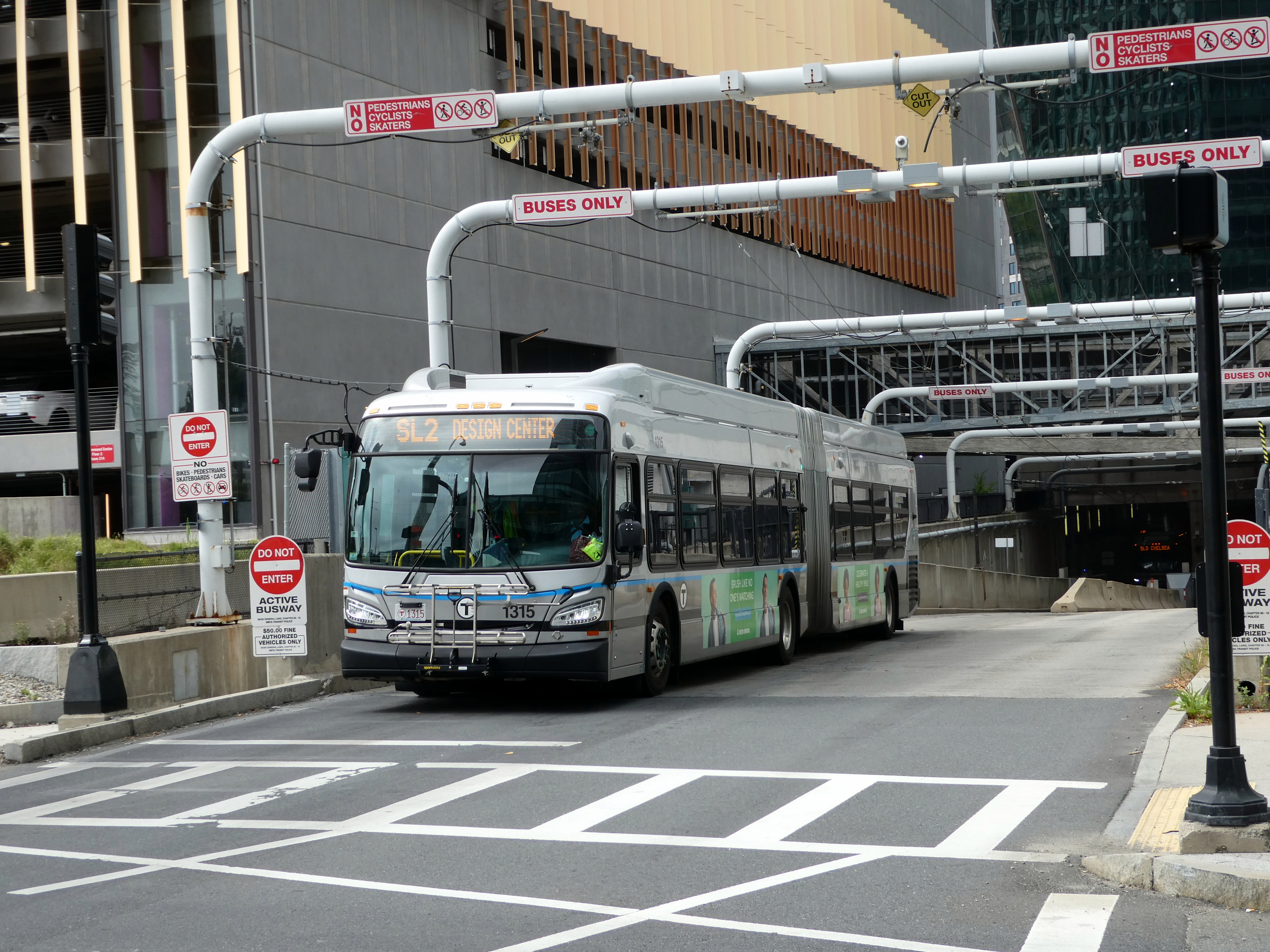
An SL2 bus waiting at the D Street light

Key features of bus rapid transit include dedicated lanes, frequent service, off-vehicle fare collection, sheltered stations, and intelligent transportation systems features such as transit signal priority. A 2011 study by the Institute for Transportation and Development Policy (ITDP) determined that the Silver Line was best classified as "Not BRT" because it lacked many of these BRT Standard features.

Off-board fare collection is only present at the three underground stops. A significant portion of delays on the surface sections are caused by long dwell times, as passengers only board through the front door to pay at the single farebox. On June 6, 2012, Massport began funding a three-month pilot of free fares from the five Logan Airport stops as an effort to decrease traffic congestion at the airport terminals. Within the first month, average dwell time dropped by 20 seconds per stop. Massport later extended the pilot until January 2013, then made free fares from Logan permanent. Stops on the Washington Street routes with more than fifteen passengers have an average dwell time of over one minute, which affects both running time and reliability. A two-week pilot program in 2017 tested all-door boarding on these routes, with free fares funded by a nonprofit. The pilot halved dwell times at busy stops, reduced overall average dwell time from 24 to 19 seconds, and increased reliability. All-door boarding will be permanently implemented on all routes in the 2020s as part of the AFC 2.0 fare system.

The Washington Street routes have dedicated bus lanes between Herald Street and Melnea Cass Boulevard, as well as on Essex Street. However, these lanes are not physically separated from general traffic lanes and are designated as right-turn lanes at many intersections. A lack of loading zones causes many vehicles to double-park in the bus lanes, and violations of the exclusive lanes are rarely prosecuted. In the most congested parts of the corridor – Nubian Square and Downtown Crossing – no dedicated lanes are present. Transit signal priority (TSP) was only planned for four locations on Washington Street. Due to conflicts between the MBTA, the contractors, and the city, the TSP equipment was not activated until 2006. Due to the lack of BRT elements, running times on the corridor show significant variability. Peak-hour times were as much as 1.7 times that of uncontested periods in 2006, indicating that the limited BRT elements on Washington Street were ineffective at actually speeding travel during congested periods. Headway reliability is poor, largely due to operators failing to depart Nubian on time. Additional enforced downtown bus lanes, plus traffic restrictions on Temple Place and new loading zones in Chinatown, were added by the city in 2020. In 2025, route SL4 was the slowest MBTA bus route, with an average speed of 6.09 miles per hour (9.80 km/h); route SL5 was the eighth-slowest at 6.58 miles per hour (10.59 km/h).

Although the Transitway is a dedicated bus tunnel without interference from automobile traffic, Waterfront service is no faster than the on-street buses it replaced. The tunnel was built for a maximum speed of 25 miles per hour (40 km/h); the narrow lanes without guided buses limit actual speeds to 15 miles per hour (24 km/h). Water leakage and poor drainage has damaged the concrete floor of the tunnel, leading to "poor ride quality". The switch between electric and diesel power at Silver Line Way also represents a "significant delay". Because the original Transitway design ended at D Street, buses must cross the street at a traffic light. A 2003 study indicated extending the Transitway tunnel under D Street ("T under D") for grade separation was feasible, with a cost around $75 million. The light has attracted criticism from riders due to the delays it causes. A 2013 study found a median delay of 1.5 minutes per round trip at the light. In early 2016, the Boston Transportation Department modified the traffic light to use a fixed cycle, rather than relying on the detection of buses (only done during part of the cycle) to give a green light for the Transitway. However, the BTD's modifications did not modify the unusually-long 100-second cycle length nor actively prioritize buses, leading to criticism from transportation planners that the solution was inadequate. Proposed air rights development over the station is required not to preclude later grade separation of D Street. A gate and movable bollard near the light, which are used to prevent private vehicles from entering the Transitway, also cause delays to buses.

Although stop spacing varies widely between BRT systems, distances from 0.5 miles (0.80 km) to 1.0 mile (1.6 km) are typically recommended. Even after dropping half the stops, the Washington Street corridor averages only 0.25 miles (0.40 km) between stops, with several stop spacings as low as 0.10 miles (0.16 km). The Washington Street stops were built with open canopies; protected shelters were not added until 2010. A small traditional glass shelter is available at Temple Place; Boylston, Chinatown, and Tufts Medical Center have no shelters at all. Silver Line Way and the SL2 surface stops have glass shelters or none at all; the SL3 surface stops have canopies without shelters.

==== Indirect routing ====
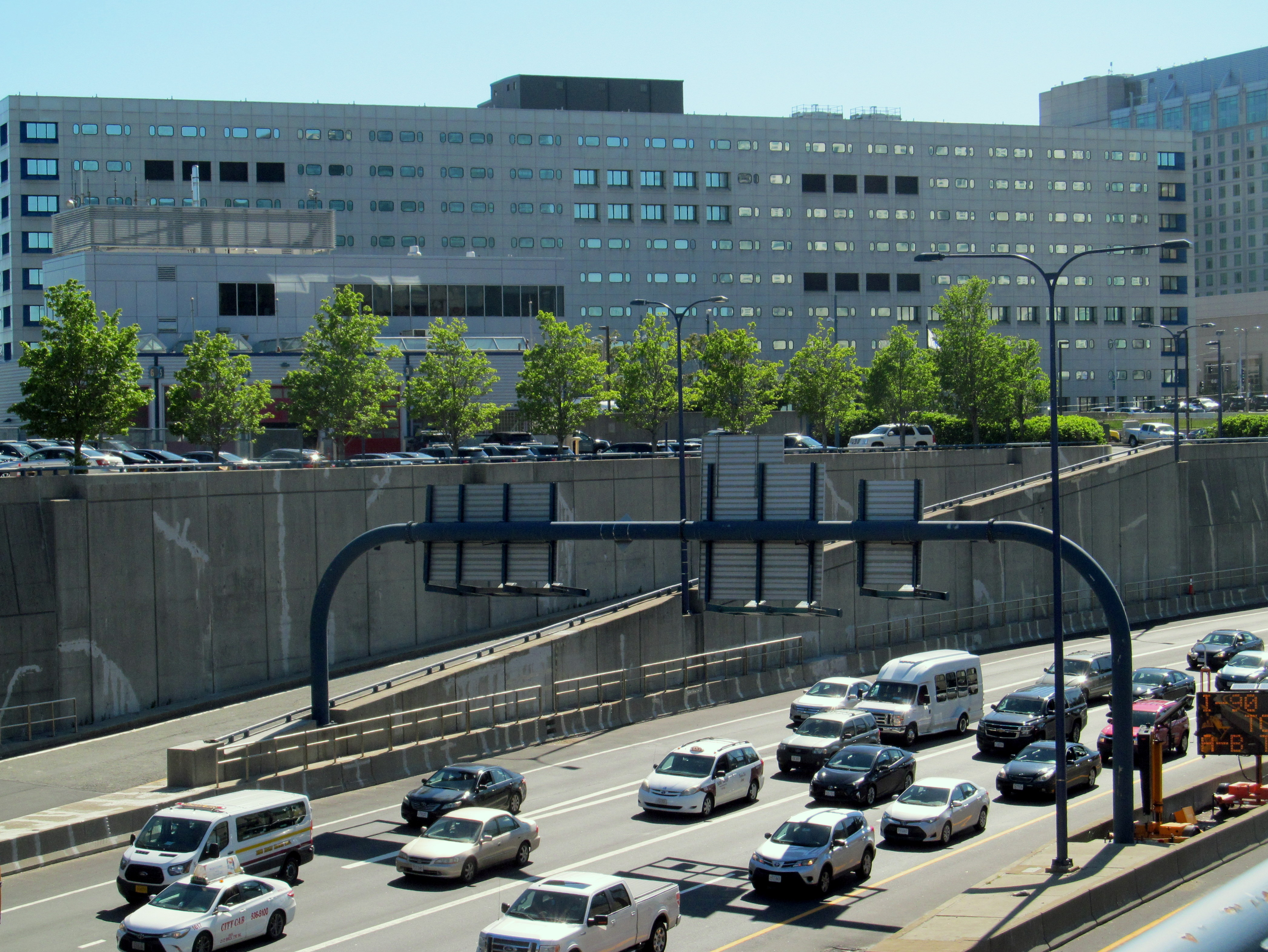
The disputed ramp in 2017

Because the Transitway was not originally designed for service to Logan Airport or Chelsea, it does not have a direct connection to the Ted Williams Tunnel. Outbound SL1 and SL3 buses must travel 0.5 miles (0.80 km) west on Haul Road from Silver Line Way to access an eastbound ramp west of B Street, then travel east on a frequently-congested section of I-90. Inbound buses must exit I-90 at B Street and travel 0.3 miles (0.48 km) east on Congress Street to reach Silver Line Way. An eastbound entrance ramp near Silver Line Way, normally restricted for use by Massachusetts State Police vehicles and MassDOT maintenance vehicles from an adjacent operations center, can shorten the outbound routing by about 0.7 miles (1.1 km). MassDOT claims the ramp was not designed for buses, though Big Dig planner Fred Salvucci has claimed it was. Outbound buses were temporarily allowed to use the ramp in 2006 after the Big Dig ceiling collapse, when there was no regular eastbound traffic through the tunnel. The Urban Ring was also proposed to use the ramp. A 2010 study indicated that the ramp was safe for use by the Silver Line.

Transit advocates have since pushed to allow use of the ramp by Silver Line buses ("Free the ramp"), though MassDOT claims the ramp is not safe to use when highway traffic is freely flowing. The MBTA hired a consultant in 2018 to study potential use of the ramp. In May 2019, MassDOT agreed to a limited test of ramp use, though advocates criticized MassDOT for limiting the test to only the evening peak hour, and only when highway speeds did not exceed 30 miles per hour (48 km/h). The three-day test in August 2019 resulting in average time savings of 3–8 minutes per bus, with significantly larger time savings at the most congested times. After these results, MassDOT agreed to make modifications to the ramp entrance to eventually allow use of the ramp whenever traffic speeds are below 30 mph.

Silver Line buses were again allowed to use the ramp during a 2023 closure of the Sumner Tunnel.

==== Other issues ====
The SL3 route is subject to frequent delays due to the opening of the Chelsea Street Bridge – as many as ten times per day – for ships serving the upstream oil terminals. Each bridge opening causes a delay of up to 20 minutes, and the only alternate route involves a lengthy detour on Route 1A. Federal regulations give priority to marine traffic. In December 2018, MassDOT officials sought to create a six-month pilot program to reduce peak-hour openings of the bridge, as well as the nearby Meridian Street Bridge used by the busy 116 and 117 bus routes.

The CNG buses bought for the Washington Street service caused disruptive 35 Hz vibrations in nearby residential buildings. It took a year to retrofit the fleet with new mufflers; during that time, older buses which did not have that problem were used at night.

== See also ==
- Trolleybuses in Greater Boston
