= Tufts Medical Center station =

Subway station in Boston, Massachusetts, US

Tufts Medical Center
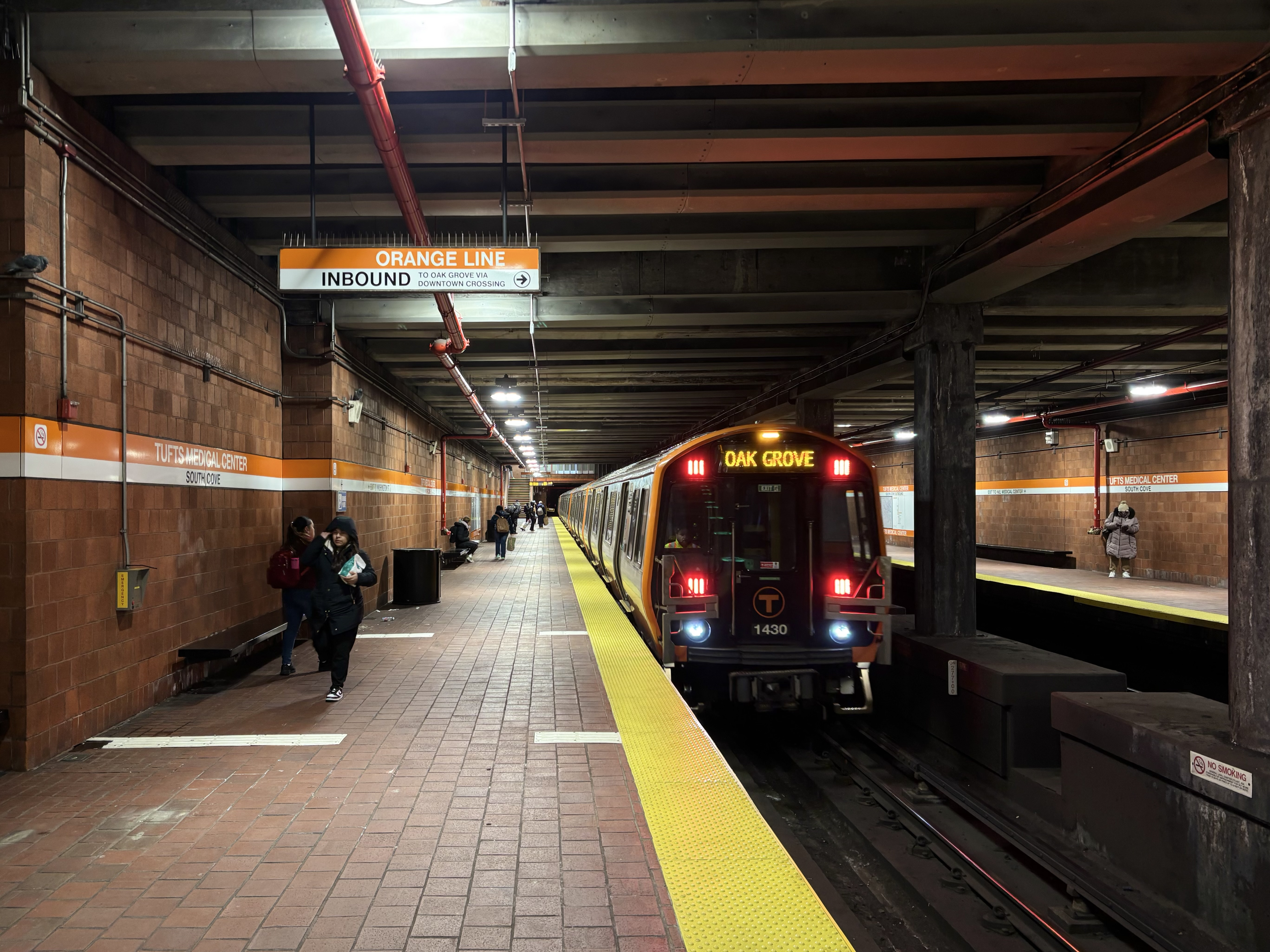
- A northbound Orange Line train entering the station in 2025

General information
- Location: 750 Washington Street; Boston, Massachusetts
- Coordinates: 42.34934°N 71.06433°W
- Line: South Cove Tunnel
- Platforms: 2 side platforms
- Tracks: 2
- Connections: MBTA bus: 11, 43

Construction
- Structure type: Underground
- Accessible: Yes

History
- Opened: May 4, 1987 (Orange Line); July 30, 2002 (Silver Line)
- Former names: New England Medical Center (1987–2010)

Passengers
- FY2019: 5,976 daily boardings

Services
Preceding station	MBTA	Following station
Back Bay toward Forest Hills	Orange Line	Chinatown toward Oak Grove
Herald Street toward Nubian	Silver Line SL4	Chinatown toward South Station
Herald Street toward Nubian	Silver Line SL4	Chinatown Gate One-way operation
Herald Street toward Nubian	Silver Line SL5	Chinatown toward Downtown Crossing
Herald Street toward Nubian	Silver Line SL5	Boylston One-way operation
Location

Tufts Medical Center station is an underground Massachusetts Bay Transportation Authority (MBTA) rapid transit station in Boston, Massachusetts. It serves the MBTA subway Orange Line, as well as two Silver Line bus rapid transit routes on the surface. It is named for the Tufts Medical Center and is built under a wing of the facility that crosses over Washington Street in downtown Boston between Kneeland Street in Chinatown and the Massachusetts Turnpike. The accessible station has two side platforms for the Orange Line.

Construction of the South Cove Tunnel and the station shell took place in 1968–1971 in preparation for a rerouting of the Orange Line into the Interstate 95 median. The highway project was cancelled; the right of way was reused as the Southwest Corridor. It opened in 1987, along with the New England Medical Center station. Silver Line service began in 2002. The station was renamed Tufts Medical Center in 2010.

== Station layout ==
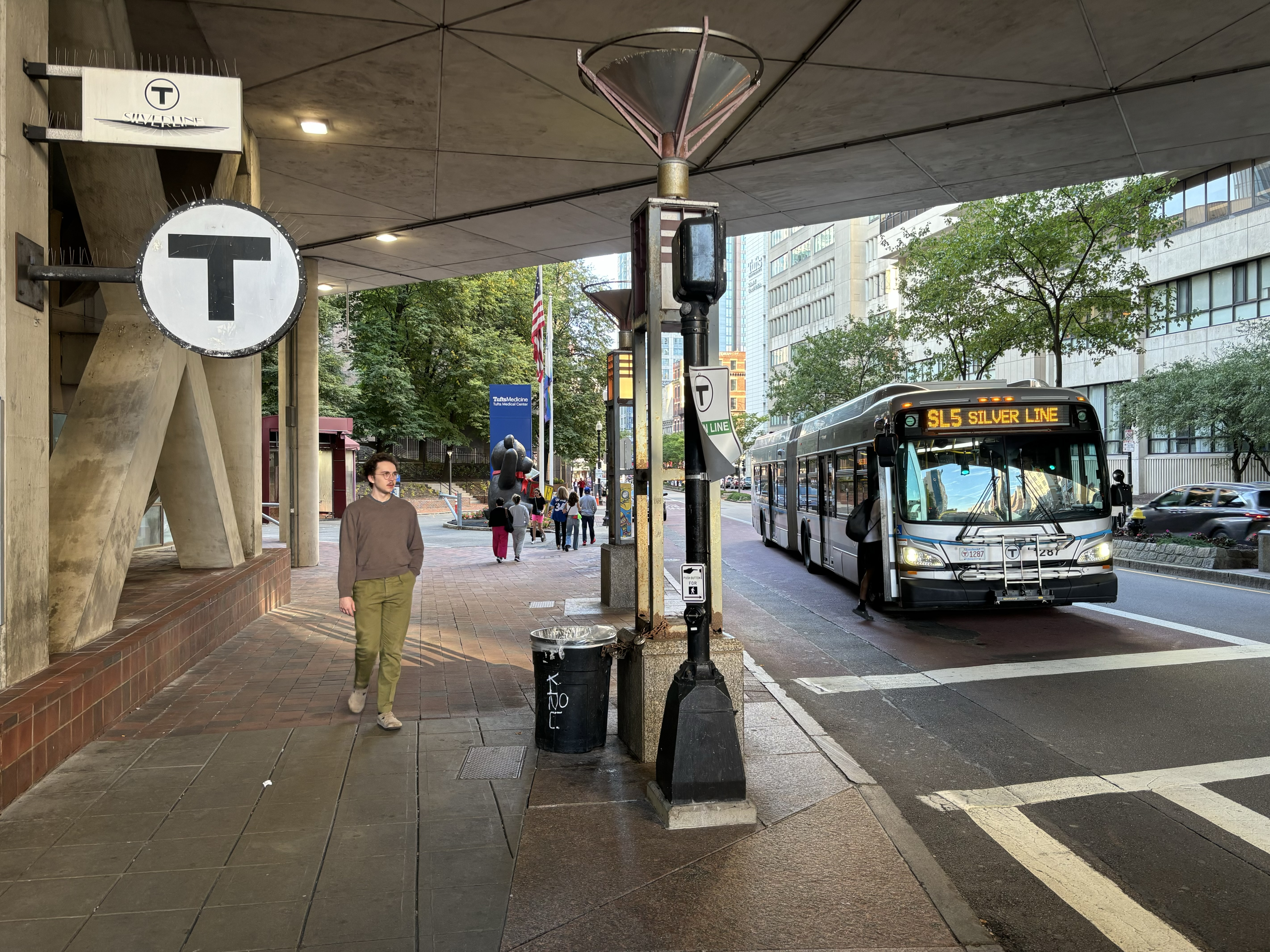
An outbound Silver Line bus at the station in 2024

The station was constructed under a city block that had been previously cleared for the South Cove urban renewal effort. This gives it several important differences from Chinatown, Downtown Crossing, and State along Washington Street to the north, which were all threaded among existing underground structures. Because it was easier to dig deeply on the empty plot, Tufts Medical Center station has a subsurface fare mezzanine, rather than having faregates located immediately adjacent to the platforms. The platform areas are much wider and taller than the older stations, and the inbound and outbound platforms are directly opposite each other, rather than offset.

The station was not constructed directly under Washington Street; it is angled towards Tremont Street to the west, as the line then curves towards Back Bay. Unlike the older stations, there is a single headhouse on the west side of Washington Street rather than smaller entrances on both sides of the street. This entrance is located under an overhang of a Tufts Medical Center building. There is a secondary entrance without elevator access, located on Tremont Street at Oak Street. Adding elevators to the South Cove entrance was considered by the MBTA in 2017.

Tufts Medical Center serves both routes (SL4 and SL5) of the Washington Street section of the Silver Line, which operates between downtown and Nubian. Silver Line buses stop at the primary station entrance on Washington Street. The station is also served by MBTA bus routes 11 and 43.

=== Artwork ===
Artwork was added to the station as part of the Arts on the Line program. Four abstract works, titled Caravan, are displayed beside each of the two escalators to the train platforms, They consist of painted aluminum shapes designed by Richard Gubernick, who also has artwork displayed in LaSalle station in Buffalo, New York. At each station between Forest Hills and Tufts Medical Center, two granite monuments have been inscribed with text. Those at Tufts are the poem "Mr. Yee is in the Garden" by Maria Gordett (outside the secondary entrance) and the short story "The Great World Transformed" by Gish Jen (inside the main entrance).

== History ==
=== Previous proposals ===
In 1914, the Boston Transit Commission considered constructing a station at Bennet Street where the Washington Street Tunnel rose to the surface to meet the Washington Street Elevated. The proposal was rejected due to the steep grade and the proximity to Boylston station.

In May 1924, the state legislature directed the Metropolitan District Commission to plan an expanded rapid transit system in Boston. The report, released in December 1926, called for the existing streetcar tunnels in Boston to be reorganized into two rapid transit lines with high-floor rolling stock. The southern branch of the Tremont Street subway would have been extended southwest to Brigham Circle; among the intermediate stations was to be a subway station at the Pleasant Street Portal a block west of Washington Street.

=== Construction ===
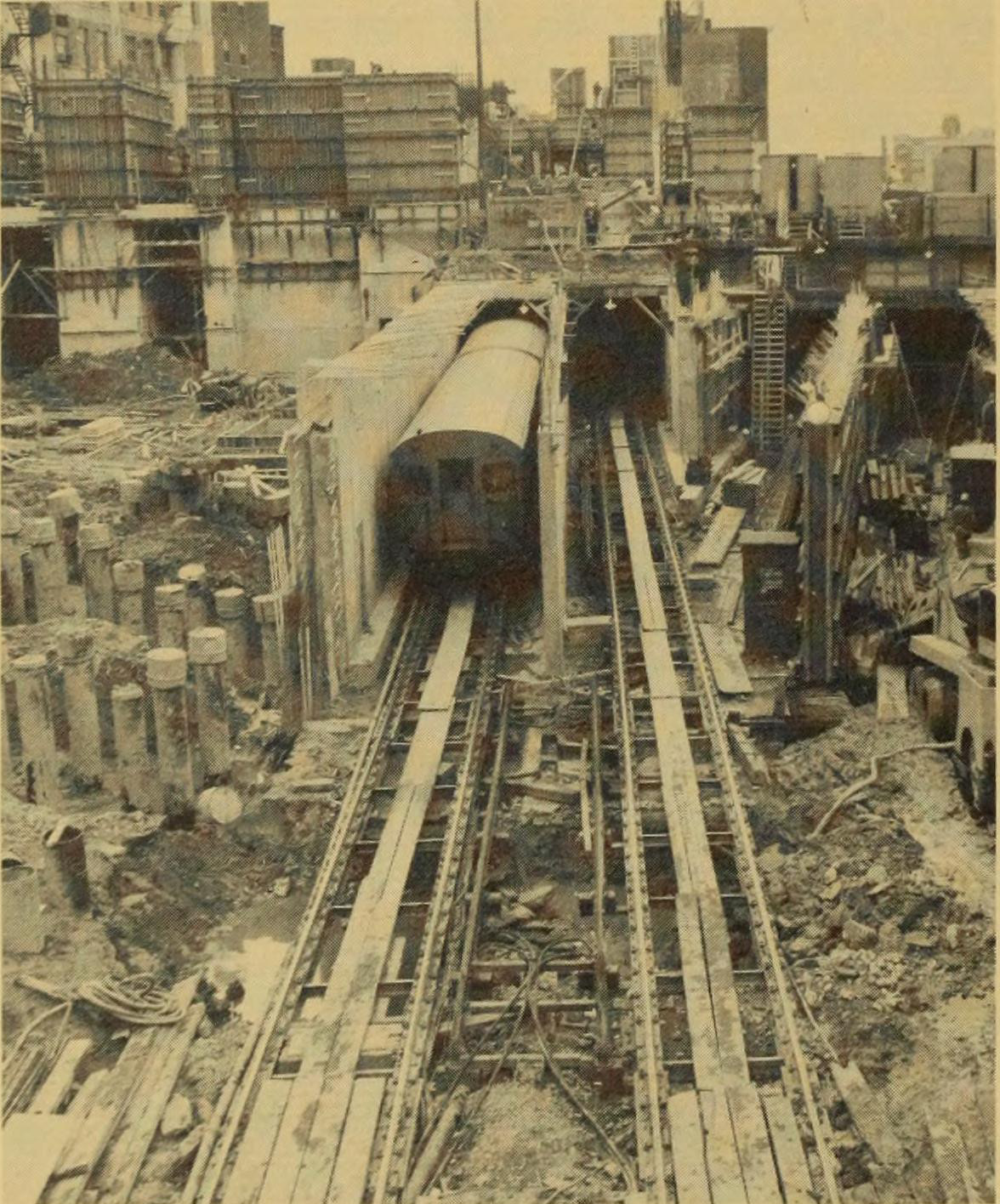
The South Cove Tunnel (right) under construction in March 1971

In September 1968, the MBTA began construction of the shell of a station - then called South Cove - and the South Cove Tunnel during what were to be the early stages of the abandoned Interstate 695 project, in anticipation of the future relocation of the Washington Street Elevated. The relocated Orange Line was to run in the median of the extended I-95 in the Southwest Corridor, then replace service on the Needham Line to Needham. Due to a lack of available federal funds, the MBTA financed the $13.3 million project with local bond funds. The tunnel (which reached to Marginal Street) and the station shell were completed in 1972. However, I-695 was cancelled due to local opposition in 1971; the Elevated remained in service, and the South Cove Tunnel and station sat unused.

After the plans for I-95 to be extended into downtown fell through in 1973, the state began looking to use the Southwest Corridor for a combined Orange Line and commuter rail corridor. In 1975, the MBTA applied for $29 million in federal grants to extend the South Cove Tunnel to just past Arlington Street and to finish the interior of South Cove station. Construction began in earnest on the Southwest Corridor in 1979. In 1985, as part of a series of station name changes, the MBTA board voted to name the station New England Medical Center, with South Cove retained as a secondary name. The station opened on May 4, 1987, along with eight other stations from Back Bay to Forest Hills.

Silver Line service on Washington Street between Nubian and Downtown Crossing started on July 20, 2002, replacing the former route 49 bus. Additional service to South Station (now signed SL4) began on October 15, 2009. The station was renamed to Tufts Medical Center on March 19, 2010, after the New England Medical Center similarly changed its name. The entire Orange Line, including Tufts Medical Center station, was closed from August 19 to September 18, 2022, during maintenance work.
