= Da Capo Press =

American publishing company

- Parent company: Hachette Books (Hachette Book Group)
- Founded: 1964; 62 years ago
- Country of origin: United States
- Headquarters location: Exchange Place; Boston, Massachusetts
- Imprints: Lifelong
- Official website: www.dacapopress.com

Da Capo Press is an American publishing company with headquarters in Boston. In 2018, it became an imprint of Hachette Books.

== History ==
De Capo Press was founded in 1964 as a publisher of music books, as a division of Plenum Publisher. As of 2009 it had additional offices in New York City, Philadelphia, Los Angeles, and Emeryville, California. In 2008, it had net sales of more than $2.5 million.

Da Capo Press became a general trade publisher in the mid-1970s. The name "Da Capo" is an Italian musical term that means "from the beginning", often used in sheet music to indicate that a piece should be repeated from the start. It was sold to the Perseus Books Group of New York City in 1999 after Plenum was sold to Wolters Kluwer, a Dutch company. In the last decade, its production has consisted of mostly nonfiction titles, both hardcover and paperback, focusing on history, music, the performing arts, sports, and popular culture. In 2003, Lifelong Books was founded as a health and wellness imprint. When Marlowe & Company became part of the imprint in 2007, Lifelong's range was expanded to include the New Glucose Revolution series and numerous diabetes titles, as well as books on healthful cooking, psychology, personal growth, and sexuality. In 2009 the company posted the science portion of the book Jetpack Dreams on the web for free.

In April 2016, Da Capo Press was acquired by the Hachette Book Group as part of Hachette's purchase of the Perseus Books Group. After the sale, sister imprint Seal Press became a Da Capo imprint. In 2018, Da Capo became an imprint of Hachette Books and Seal became an imprint of Basic Books.
