= Chinatown station (MBTA) =

Subway station in Boston, Massachusetts, US

Chinatown
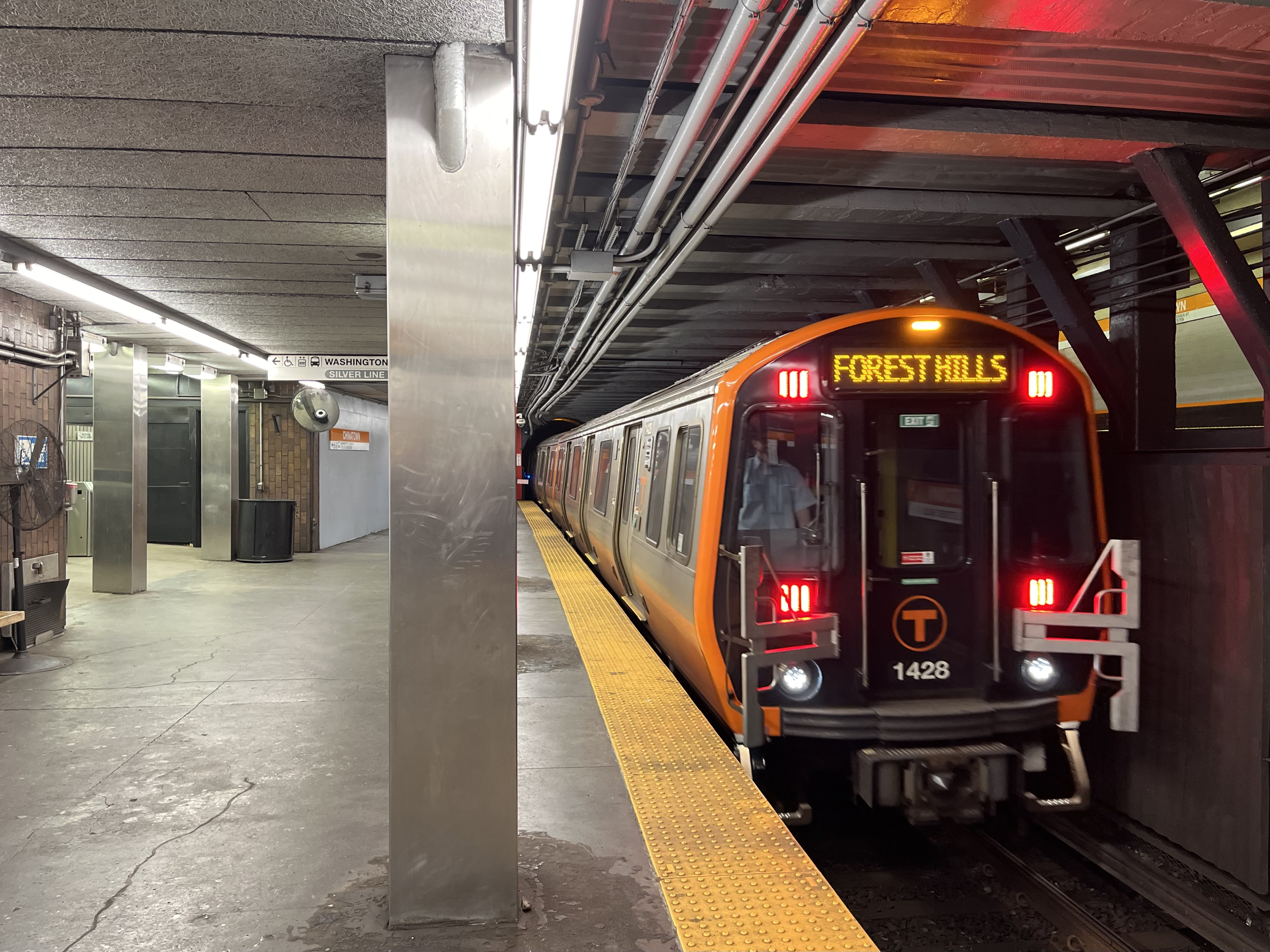
- A southbound Orange Line train entering the station in 2024

General information
- Location: Washington Street and Boylston Street; Boston, Massachusetts
- Coordinates: 42.3524°N 71.0626°W
- Line: Washington Street Tunnel
- Platforms: 2 side platforms
- Tracks: 2
- Connections: MBTA bus: 11

Construction
- Structure type: Underground
- Accessible: Yes

History
- Opened: November 30, 1908 (Orange Line); July 20, 2002 (Silver Line)
- Former names: Boylston Street / Essex (1908–1967); Essex (1967–1987)

Passengers
- FY2019: 5,747 daily boardings

Services
| Preceding station | MBTA | Following station |
|---|---|---|
| Tufts Medical Center toward Forest Hills | Orange Line | Downtown Crossing toward Oak Grove |
| Tufts Medical Center One-way operation | Silver Line SL4 | South Station Terminus |
| Tufts Medical Center One-way operation | Silver Line SL5 | Downtown Crossing Terminus |
Location

Chinatown station is a rapid transit station on the Massachusetts Bay Transportation Authority (MBTA) Orange Line, located at the edge of the Chinatown neighborhood in the downtown core of Boston, Massachusetts. The station has two offset side platforms, which run under Washington Street from Hayward Place to Lagrange Street. The three entrances are located at the intersection of Washington Street with Essex and Boylston streets. Like all Orange Line stations, both the subway platforms and all bus connections are fully accessible.

Boylston (southbound) and Essex (northbound) stations opened as part of the Washington Street Tunnel in 1908. The whole station was renamed Essex in 1967, then Chinatown in 1987. The southbound side was modernized in the 1970s, followed by the northbound side a decade later. The latter renovation added an elevator to the northbound side, with a southbound elevator added in 2002. Silver Line service began in 2002. The MBTA plans to reopen two 1970s-closed entrances at Hayward Place and Lagrange Street.

== Station layout ==
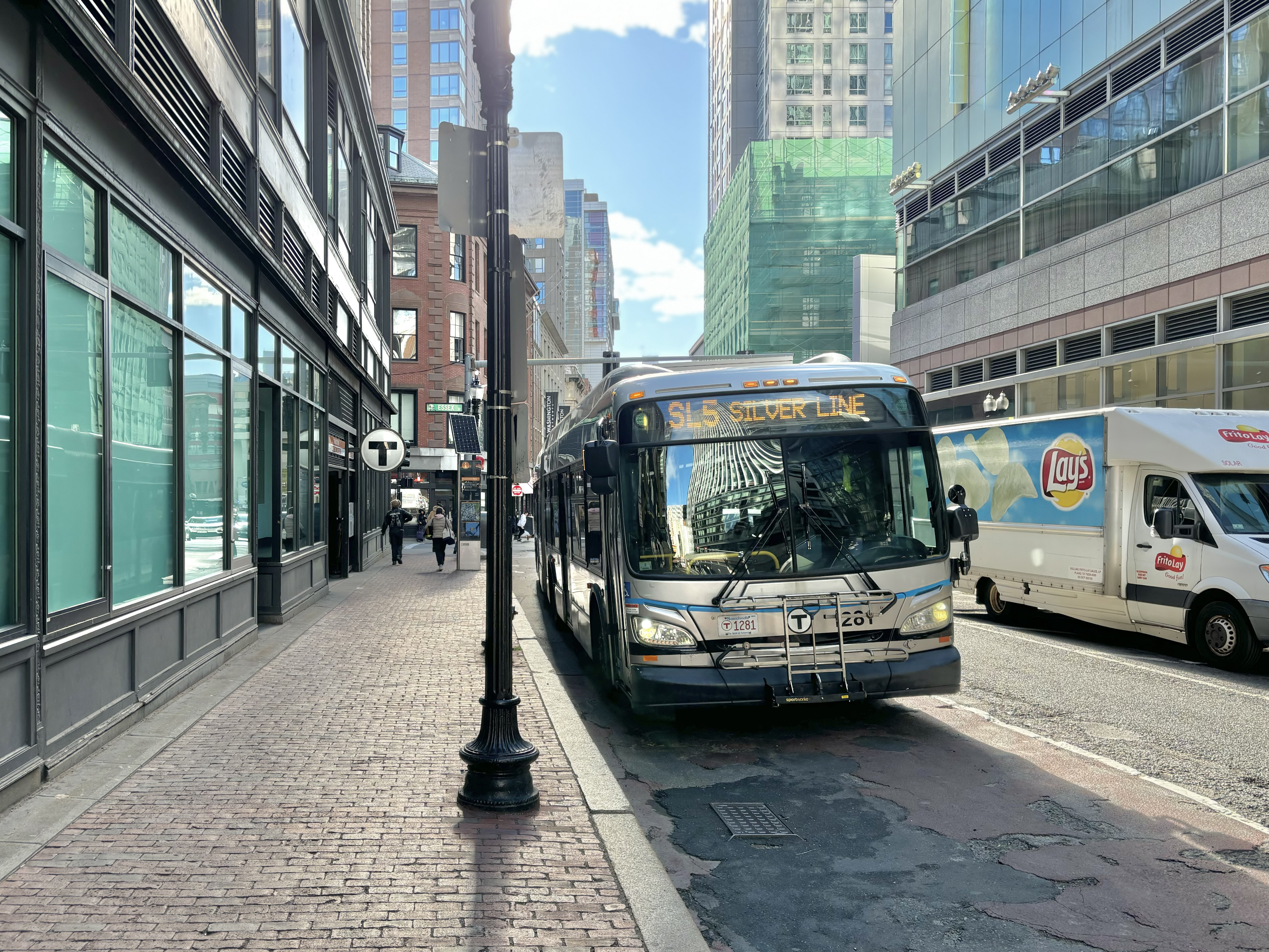
A Silver Line bus at the station in 2024

Chinatown station has two side platforms serving the two tracks of the Washington Street Tunnel. As with Downtown Crossing and State, the platforms are offset; the northbound platform runs north from Essex Street to Hayward Place, while the southbound platform runs south from Boylston Street (opposite Essex) to Lagrange Street. The platforms are also somewhat vertically offset, with the northbound platform at a higher elevation than the southbound platform. The two halves of the station are separate, making this the only station on the Orange Line not to have opposite-direction transfers.

The northbound platform has entrances integrated into commercial buildings on Washington Street north and south of Essex Street (the latter entrance is in the Liberty Tree Building), leading to a fare lobby under Essex Street. An elevator is located in the northern entrance. The southbound platform has a single entrance and elevator on Boylston Street west of Washington Street, leading to a fare lobby under a triangular plaza. Silver Line SL5 buses stop adjacent to the northern northbound entrance; SL4 and route 11 buses stop adjacent to the south entrance.

The northbound platform formerly had an additional entrance at Hayward Place, with separate entrance and exit headhouses on the north side of Hayward Place; the concourse and headhouses are extant (and used as emergency exits) but are embedded into a newer building. A disused northbound entrance is located on the south side of Essex Street east of Washington Street. A disused entrance to the southbound platform was located at Lagrange Street; it also serves as an emergency exit. A disused sub-passage connects the inbound and outbound platforms.

== History ==
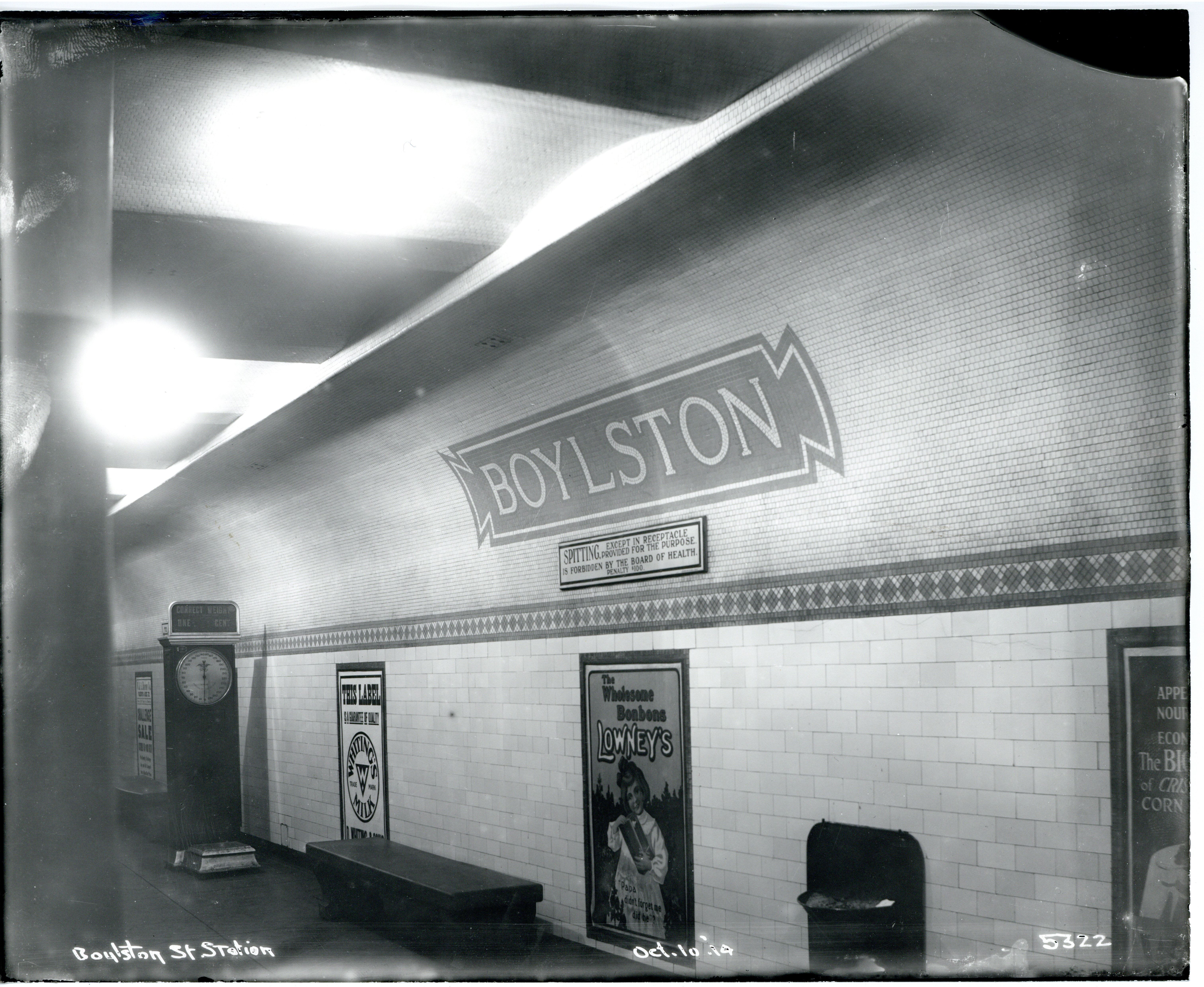
The southbound (Boylston) platform in 1914

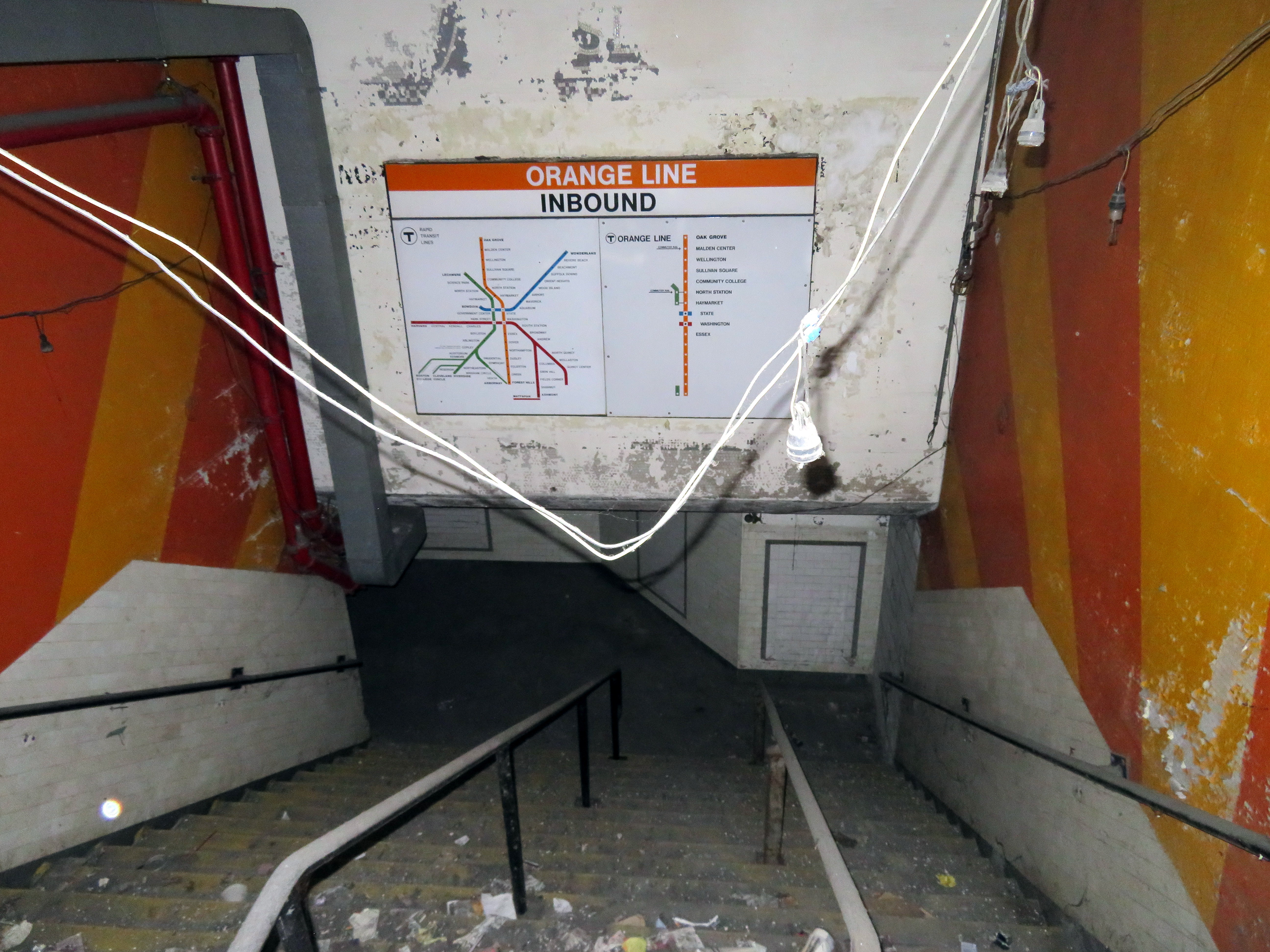
Interior of the disused Essex Street entrance, with a 1977 map and parts of the original gray tile mosaic visible

The station originally opened on November 30, 1908, along with the rest of the Washington Street Tunnel. At this time, the Boston Elevated Railway's Main Line (which later became the Orange Line) was moved from the Tremont Street Subway into this new subway tunnel. As with the other stations of the Washington Street Tunnel, the platforms were largely separated and given different names - Boylston for the southbound platform, and Essex for the northbound side. On February 11, 1967, as part of a larger renaming of Orange Line stations, the entire station became Essex (to distinguish it from the Green Line's Boylston station to the west). On November 27, 1972, two robbers killed an MBTA porter while looting the fareboxes at the station.

In May 1972, the MBTA opened a new southbound headhouse to accommodate a realignment of Boylston Street. That month, the agency received a federal grant that funded two-thirds of a $14.3 million modernization program. As part of that project, the MBTA investigated the feasibility of connecting Essex, Park Street, Washington, and State with pedestrian tunnels. (The Winter Street Concourse was opened to passengers in 1979, connecting Park Street and Washington, but Essex and State were never connected with the others.) A $378,323 contract for modernization work on the southbound side, including a platform extension, was awarded in 1975; the Lagrange Street and Hayward Place entrances were likely closed during the work.

As part of the renovation, George Greenamyer constructed an 18-by-9-foot (5.5 m × 2.7 m), 20,000-pound (9,100 kg) artwork on the southbound platform in 1976. The first sculpture in the MBTA's arts program, it was styled after an old steam locomotive, and incorporated scrapped locomotive and truck parts. The three locomotive driving wheels were recast from original wood molds owned by the Edaville Railroad. The sculpture, Farewell to Steam, was later relocated to the commuter rail level at Back Bay station.

On March 3, 1982, the station was temporarily closed due to budget cuts, while Bowdoin and Boylston stations were reduced to limited hours. Essex station was reopened on April 17, 1982.

A $3.3 million modernization of the northbound side was approved on April 2, 1986, with a groundbreaking held on May 30. The project added an elevator to the northbound platform and a new entrance north of Essex Street; the Essex Street headhouse was closed. An extension of the northbound platform was completed shortly before six-car train service began on August 18, 1987. The renovation added a new artwork to the station: Colors on the Line, by Toshihiro Katayama, consists of 44 colorful enameled steel panels along the wall of the northbound track. Katayama wrote that "I instantly heard the voice of this station telling me...to relieve the darkness with a range of bright colors." On May 4, 1987, the station was renamed Chinatown concurrent with the opening of the Southwest Corridor; the change (likely an effort to rebrand the declining Combat Zone) had been approved in 1985 as part of a series of station name changes.

The Millennium Place development, completed in 2001, was constructed on a long-vacant lot surrounding the southbound headhouse. A simultaneous station renovation included a rebuilt headhouse and a new elevator built into the new development. The $5 million project, completed in 2002, made the station fully accessible. Silver Line service on Washington Street between Dudley and Downtown Crossing (now route SL5) started on July 20, 2002. Additional service to South Station (route SL4) began on October 15, 2009. Both routes operate on one-way loops in downtown Boston, serving Chinatown station only in the northbound direction.

Improvements to wayfinding signage began in mid-2019 and were completed in 2021. In May 2020, the MBTA awarded a $8.75 million design contract for accessibility renovations at both Chinatown and State stations. The work at Chinatown includes reopening the Hayward Place and Lagrange Street entrances with added elevators, replacement of the existing elevators, and lobby renovations. Design worked reached 30% completion in 2021 and 75% completion in 2022. The entire Orange Line, including Chinatown station, was closed from August 19 to September 18, 2022, during maintenance work.
