= Tufts station =

Tufts station may refer to several stations in the US state of Massachusetts:

- Tufts Medical Center station, on the MBTA Orange Line in downtown Boston
- Medford/Tufts station, on the MBTA Green Line in Medford
- Davis station, on the MBTA Red Line in Somerville, subtitled "Tufts University" by announcements
