= Boston.com =

Regional news and information website

- Website type: News
- Available in: English
- Owner: Boston Globe Media Partners
- Creator: The Boston Globe
- Editor: Kaitlyn Johnston
- General manager: Matthew Karolian
- Website: boston.com
- Commercial: Yes
- Launched: October 30, 1995; 31 years ago

Boston.com is a regional website that offers news and information about the Boston, Massachusetts area. It is owned and operated by Boston Globe Media Partners, publisher of The Boston Globe.

== History ==
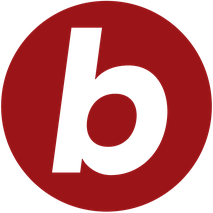
Logo, c. 2018

Boston.com was one of the first news websites on the public web, launched in late October 1995 by Boston Globe Electronic Publishing Inc. The domain name was purchased from the Boston-area café chain Au Bon Pain in exchange for print advertisements for charities chosen by Au Bon Pain's CEO.

Since its inception, Boston.com has covered a wide range of stories of interest to people in the region. It was the primary website of The Boston Globe until September 2011, when the Globe launched a subscription-only website. Boston.com remained free, to provide "full daily sports coverage, breaking news updates, online features, and lifestyle information".

The site also maintains a mobile application for iPhone and Android devices, which connects readers with stories featured on the website.

== Relation to The Boston Globe ==
On September 12, 2011, The Boston Globe launched a separate site at BostonGlobe.com that put most of its newsroom content behind a paywall. Since that time, Boston.com has been a separate, standalone entity providing coverage of local news, sports, weather, and leisure.

As of 2025, Boston.com allows readers a set number of free articles before requiring a subscription.

The two media outlets share office space at 1 Exchange Place in Downtown Boston.
