= State station =

Subway station in Boston, Massachusetts, US

State
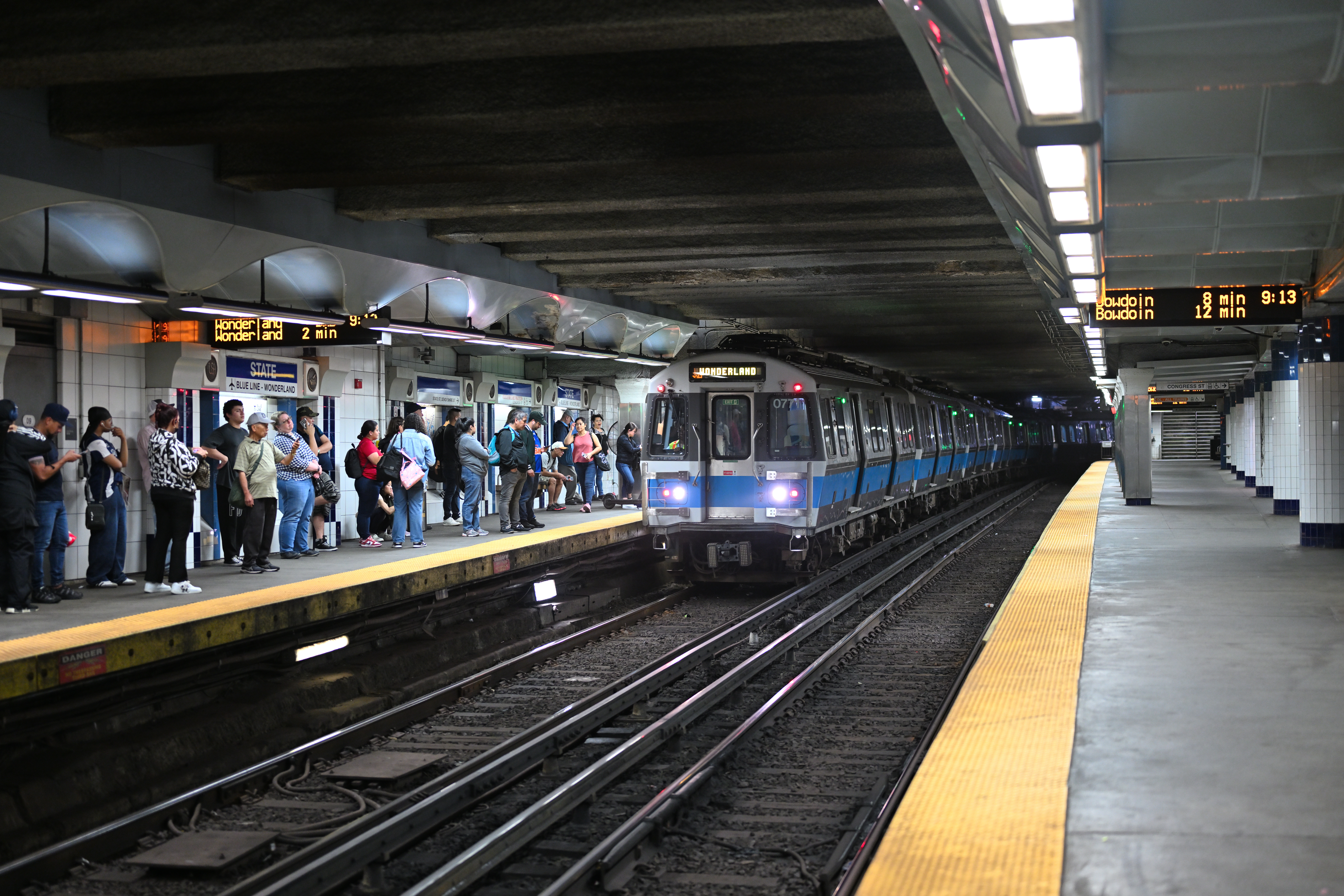
- A Wonderland-bound Blue Line train at the station in 2024

General information
- Location: Washington Street at State Street; Boston, Massachusetts
- Coordinates: 42.3587°N 71.0578°W
- Lines: East Boston Tunnel; Washington Street Tunnel
- Platforms: 4 side platforms (2 on each level)
- Tracks: 4 (2 on each level)
- Connections: MBTA bus: 4, 92, 93, 354

Construction
- Structure type: Underground
- Platform levels: 2
- Accessible: Yes

History
- Opened: December 30, 1904 (Blue Line); November 30, 1908 (Orange Line)
- Rebuilt: April 18–21, 1924; November 2004–April 26, 2011
- Former names: Devonshire (1904–1967); Milk/State (1908–1967); State/Citizens Bank (1997–2000); State/Aquarium (2004)

Passengers
- FY2019: 12,928 daily boardings

Services
Preceding station	MBTA	Following station
Downtown Crossing toward Forest Hills	Orange Line	Haymarket toward Oak Grove
Government Center toward Bowdoin	Blue Line	Aquarium toward Wonderland
Track layout
Location

State station (also called State Street) is an underground Massachusetts Bay Transportation Authority (MBTA) rapid transit station located in downtown Boston, Massachusetts. It is the transfer point between the Orange Line and the Blue Line, and one of four "hub stations" on the MBTA subway system. The Orange Line has two side platforms on two levels, while the Blue Line has two side platforms on a single level. The station is fully accessible.

The East Boston Tunnel (predecessor of the modern Blue Line) opened as a streetcar tunnel in 1904, with Devonshire one of its two stations in downtown Boston. The Washington Street Tunnel opened to carry the Main Line (predecessor of the Orange Line) in 1908, with platforms at Milk and State. In 1924, the East Boston Tunnel was converted to use metro rolling stock. The MBTA renamed the lines to the Blue Line and Orange Line in 1965, and renamed both stations to State in 1967. The Orange Line platforms were extended in the 1980s for six-car trains. A second renovation in 2006–2011 extended the Blue Line platforms and made all platforms accessible.

== Station layout ==
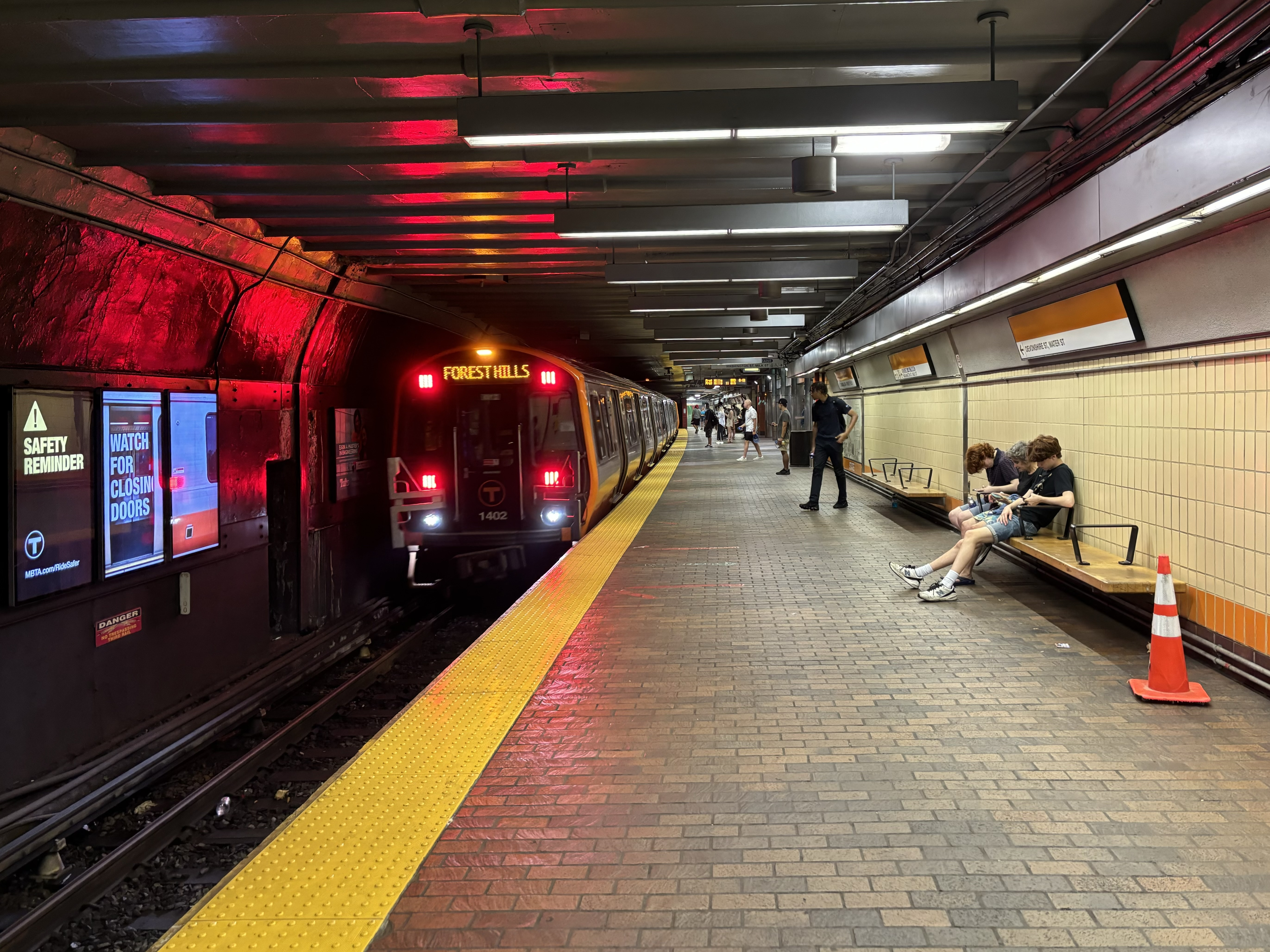
A southbound Orange Line train arriving at State station in July 2024

State is unique among Orange Line stations as it was built on two levels to fit under the narrow section of Washington Street while crossing the East Boston Tunnel. The southbound side platform is above the northbound track and furthermore staggered considerably south of the northbound side platform. The southbound platform is connected to the rest of the station by a lengthy pedestrian passageway, originally known as "the speedway". The Blue Line has two side platforms under State Street and the Old State House. The Blue Line platforms are on the same level as the southbound Orange Line platform; the Blue Line tracks pass over the northbound Orange Line platform. The station is served by MBTA bus routes 4, 92, 93, and 354.

The station's headhouses are located between Government Center and the Financial District. State station has six entrances spread out over nearly 1,000 feet (300 m); after consolidation and reconstruction by the MBTA, all entrances serve both lines in all directions. One entrance is built into the basement of the Old State House and four into commercial buildings. The northernmost entrance, which is accessed from an unmarked stairwell under 28 State Street on Government Center Plaza, was originally constructed to serve Adams Square but now primarily serves Boston City Hall.

Three entrances are fully accessible with elevators to platform level: Old South Meeting House (Washington Street at Milk Street), 53 State Street, and 60 State Street. The other three entrances - Old State House (State Street at Devonshire Street), Devonshire Street at Water Street, and Government Center Plaza - are not accessible. Two additional elevators connect the northbound Orange Line platform with the eastbound Blue Line platform and southbound Orange Line platform, while an accessible ramp connects the westbound Blue Line platform with the northbound Orange Line platform.

=== Public art ===
The station has several works of public art:

- The passageway to the southbound Orange Line platform was painted with rainbow colors by Robert V. Kennedy in March 1972. The painting and corresponding timed lighting (no longer in use) cost $9,000. Kennedy won the 1971 competition to design artwork for the station.
- Polychrome painted star, a 12-by-40-foot (3.7 m × 12.2 m) 1975 enamel-on-porcelain mural by Toshihiro Katayama, is located in the passage to the eastbound Blue Line platform.
- A 1987 black steel gate by Albert Paley is located next to the Old South Meeting House headhouse.

== History ==
=== Opening and modifications ===
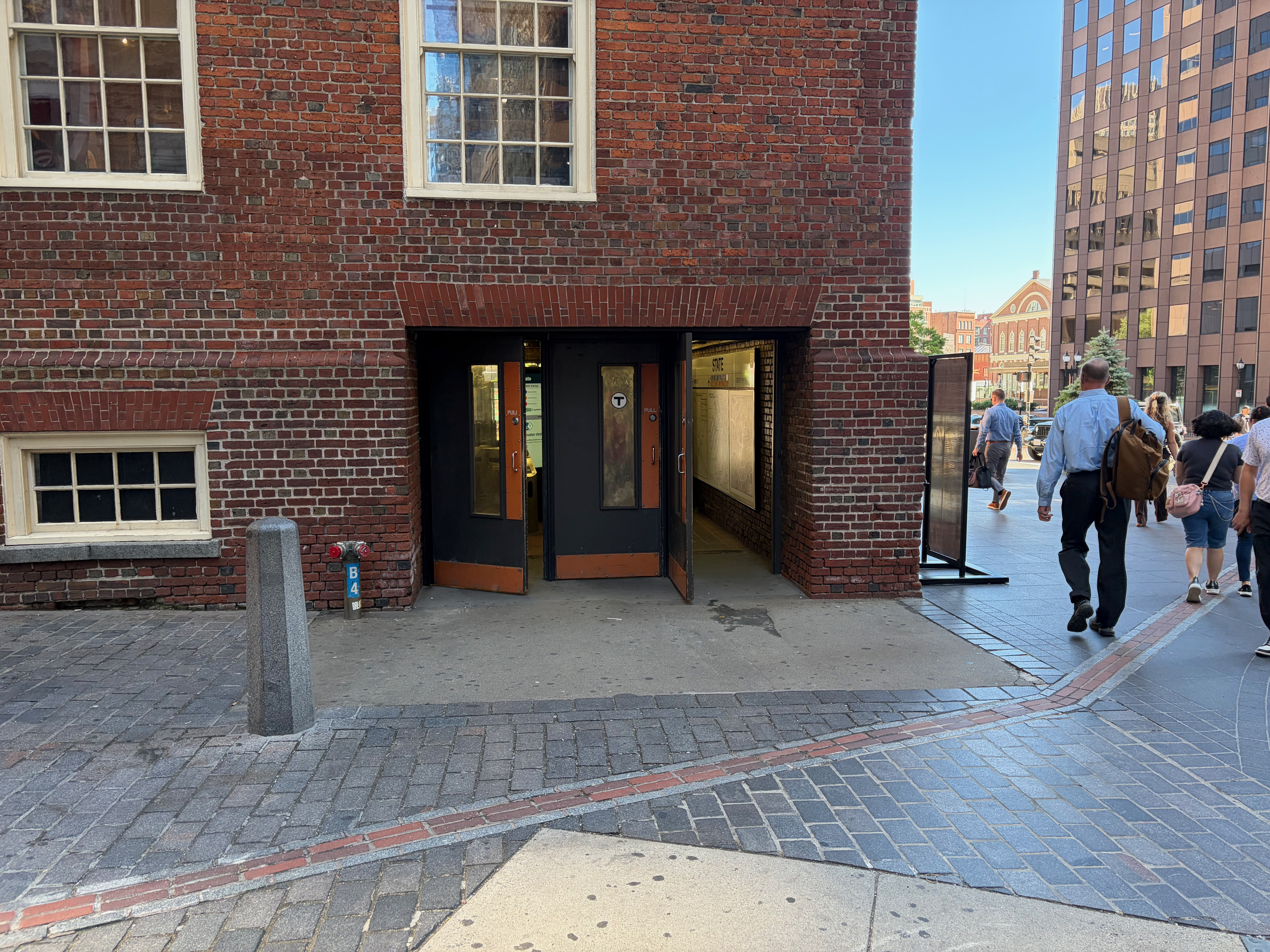
The Old State House entrance, with the Freedom Trail passing in front

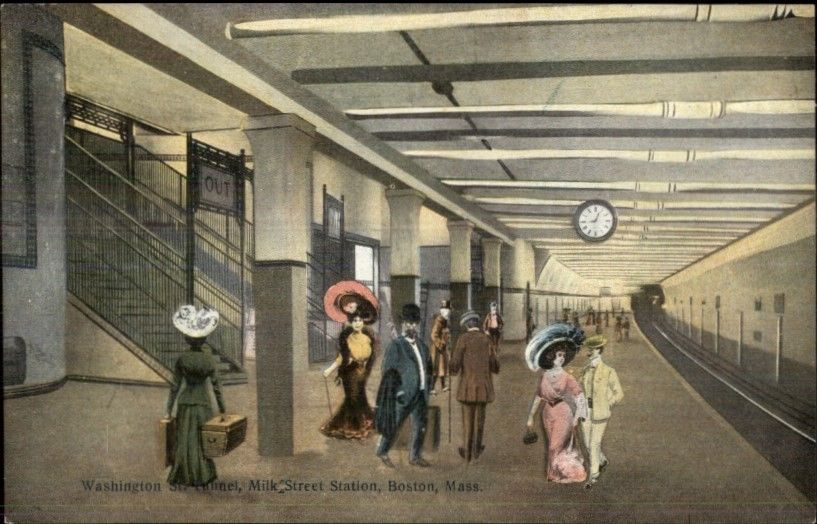
Early postcard of Milk Street station

The Blue Line section of the station was built along with the rest of the East Boston Tunnel in the first years of the 20th century and opened on December 30, 1904, serving streetcars running from downtown to East Boston. An unusual aspect of State Street station is the entrance built directly into one of Boston's best-known historic sites, the Old Massachusetts State House. The East Boston Tunnel station was originally known as Devonshire after the street which the Old State House is located on. The station is the only remaining station on the tunnel opened in 1904.

The East Boston Tunnel was originally planned to be operated with high-floor metro rolling stock and connected to the then-planned Cambridge Elevated line. When that plan was dropped in 1903 due to a disagreement between the BTC and the BERy, the stations were built with low platforms. Large bi-loading streetcars (with high floors but capable of loading from low platforms), which incorporated many attributes from metro cars used on the Main Line El, began use in 1905. However, neither these nor the large center-entrance cars introduced in 1917 (which were designed for multiple unit operation) could fully handle the crowds.

In 1921, the Boston Transit Department (BTD) - the successor to the BTC - began work at Maverick Square to convert the East Boston Tunnel to high-floor metro trains. The next year, the BTD board approved the construction of high-level platforms at Atlantic Avenue, Devonshire, Scollay Under, and Bowdoin. Construction of concrete high-level platforms 40 inches (1.0 m) above the rails at Devonshire began in December 1923 or January 1924. A section of low-level platform was left to serve streetcars during construction. The station was also extended by 30 feet (9.1 m) to accommodate the new trains, with work completed on March 1, 1924. Over the weekend of April 18–21, 1924, the East Boston Tunnel was converted to high-floor metro stock. Temporary wooden platform sections were put in place to allow service to begin on April 21, with the permanent concrete sections completed by July 12. The edges of the original low platforms can still be seen under the high platforms.

On March 31, 1937, the BERy opened an entrance from the Exchange Building lobby to the eastbound platform. The entrance was closed around 1981 as the building was modified for construction of Exchange Place.

The Washington Street Tunnel opened on November 30, 1908, to Main Line elevated trains running between Forest Hills and Sullivan Square. As with the other stations in the tunnel; the two platforms were treated as completely separate stations. The northbound platform was known as State since its main entrance was at the cross street of State Street, while the southbound platform was similarly Milk Street after its entrance from Milk Street. (The station pair was designated on some maps as Milk/State).

=== MBTA era ===
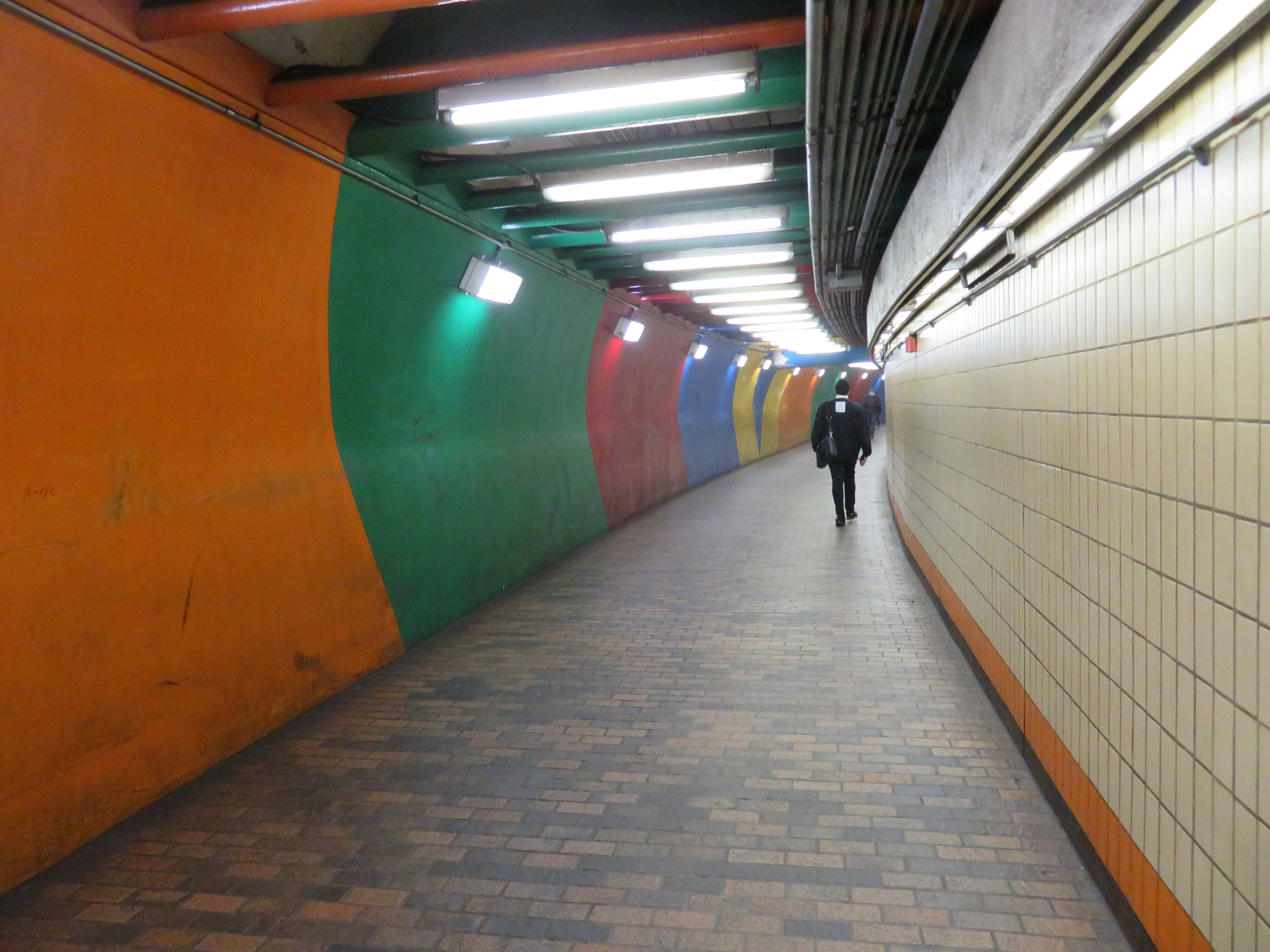
The colored paint swatches in the walkway to the southbound Orange Line platform, installed in 1972

After taking over operations in 1964, the Massachusetts Bay Transportation Authority (MBTA) began rebranding efforts. The East Boston Tunnel/Revere Extension and Main Line El/Washington Street Tunnel routes were renamed as the Blue Line and Orange Line on August 25, 1965. On January 25, 1967, the separate station names of Devonshire and Milk/State were changed to State. In 1971, the MBTA and Institute of Contemporary Art, Boston held a competition called "Design in Transit", with the winning work to be placed in the passageway to the southbound Orange Line platform. It attracted over 300 entries, many of which were criticized for being inappropriate for the setting: "spooky shadow play" that would scare riders already in a nervous atmosphere, and audio works that would add to the cacophony of the busy station. The winning work by Robert V. Kennedy had swatches of bright rainbow colors with timed lighting; it was installed in 1972.

That year, the agency received a federal grant that funded two-thirds of a $14.3 million modernization program for downtown stations. As part of that project, the MBTA investigated the feasibility of connecting Essex, Park Street, Washington, and State with pedestrian tunnels. The MBTA proposed to make the City Hall (Adams Square) headhouse exit-only during budget cuts in 1981.

In the mid-1980s, the MBTA spent $80 million to extend the platforms of seven Red Line and three Orange Line stations to allow the use of six-car trains. On October 16, 1985, the MBTA awarded a $5.03 million contract for the Orange Line work at State. Construction at State began that year and was completed in 1987. The project extended both Orange Line platforms (the shell of the northbound extension had been constructed during an earlier modernization project), and rebuilt the Milk Street entrance. Elevators were added from Milk Street to the southbound platform, and between the Orange Line platforms; this made both Orange Line platforms and the eastbound Blue Line platform accessible. (Until renovations at Haymarket and North Station in 2001, State was the closest accessible subway station to the North Station commuter rail terminal.) Six-car trains entered service on August 18, 1987, shortly after the platform extensions were complete.

From 1997 to 2000, State was renamed State/Citizens Bank in a $500,000 corporate sponsorship from Citizens Bank, who had recently moved to the area, and hoped to eventually have the name changed to simply Citizens Bank Plaza. The sponsorship failed and the name reverted to State. During the renovation of Aquarium station, during which that station was closed, State was renamed temporarily State/Aquarium from October 14, 2000, to October 29, 2001.

==== 21st century changes ====
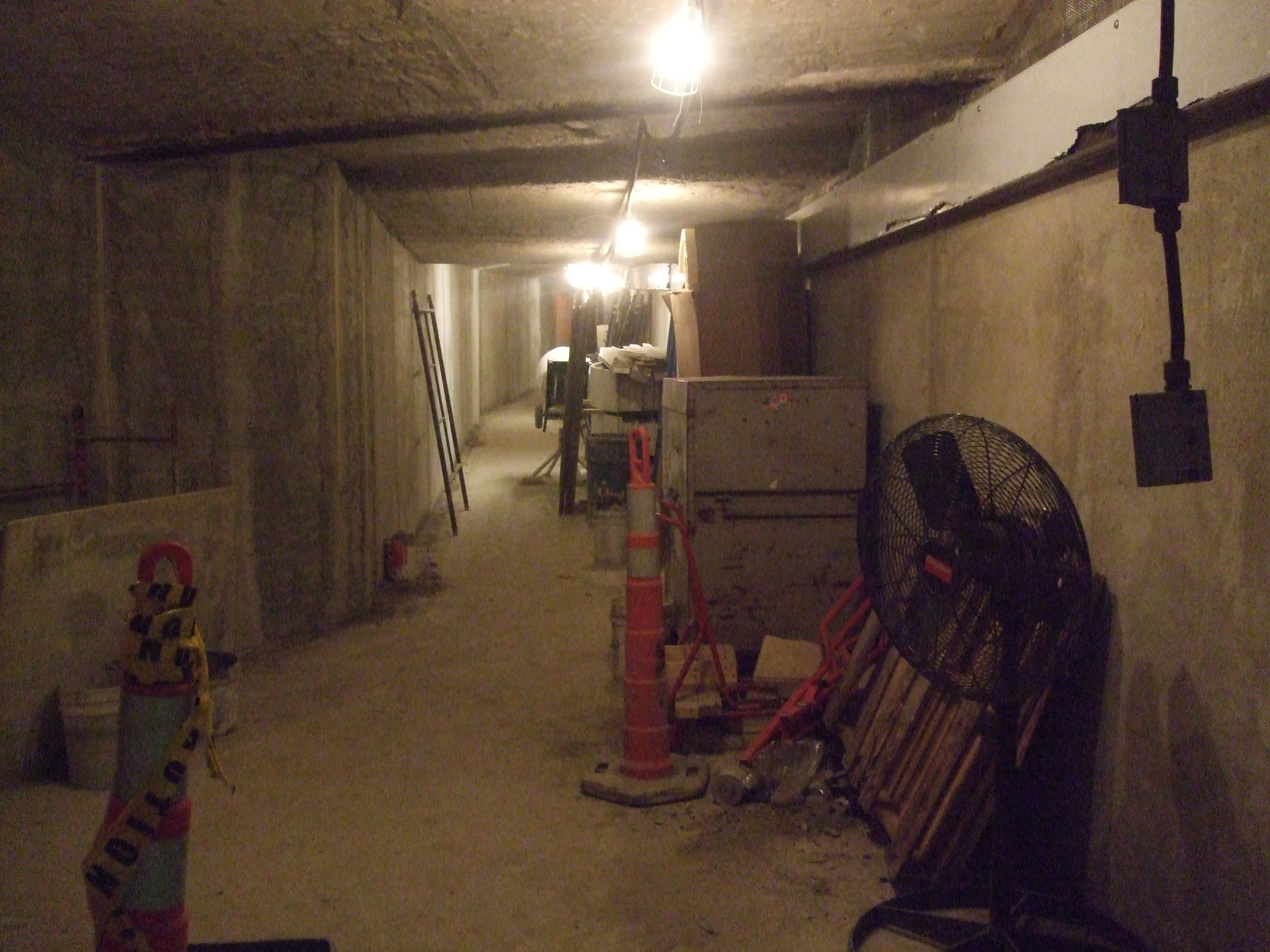
The new ramp under construction in 2010

An extensive renovation of State began in November 2004. The project added accessible Blue Line entrances at 53 State and 60 State, extended the Blue Line platforms for 6-car trains, and added a ramp between the inbound Blue Line platform and the northbound Orange Line platform. The MBTA initially expected the work to be completed in 2007 at a cost of $38 million. However, several factors prolonged the project and increased its cost. Keeping the station open during extensive underground construction proved more difficult than expected; support structures had to be drilled through centuries-old foundations and seawalls. The MBTA settled a lawsuit over systemwide accessibility issues in 2006, which necessitated changes to the station design. The settlement included the replacement of the existing elevator connecting the two platform levels.

The change from token payment to the Charliecard system required closing the Blue Line level of the station from June 24 to July 1, 2006. A new between-levels elevator was completed in 2010 in lieu of replacing the existing elevator. The reconstruction of the station was substantially completed in 2011, with a ribbon-cutting ceremony on May 26. The final project cost was $68.3 million, of which about $12 million was design and land acquisition. In October 2011, a 1904 plaque that marked the completion of the East Boston Tunnel was reinstalled in the station.

On June 24, 2019, the MBTA Board awarded a $29.7 million, 16-month contract for full cleaning, wayfinding signage replacement, and other improvements at North Station, Haymarket, State, and Downtown Crossing stations. The work was completed in June 2021. The entire Orange Line, including the Orange Line platforms at State station, was closed from August 19 to September 18, 2022, during maintenance work. A "Charlie Service Center" for MBTA customer service opened near the Old South Meeting House entrance on July 29, 2024, replacing the former CharlieCard Store at Downtown Crossing station.

In May 2020, the MBTA awarded a $8.7 million design contract for accessibility renovations at State and Chinatown. The work at State includes two elevators at the City Hall entrance, replacements of two existing elevators, and renovation of the Milk Street entrance. Design work reached 30% completion in 2021 and 75% completion in 2022. In a separate project, the original between-levels elevator was replaced in situ in 2023.
