= Downtown Crossing station =

Subway station in Boston, Massachusetts, US

Downtown Crossing
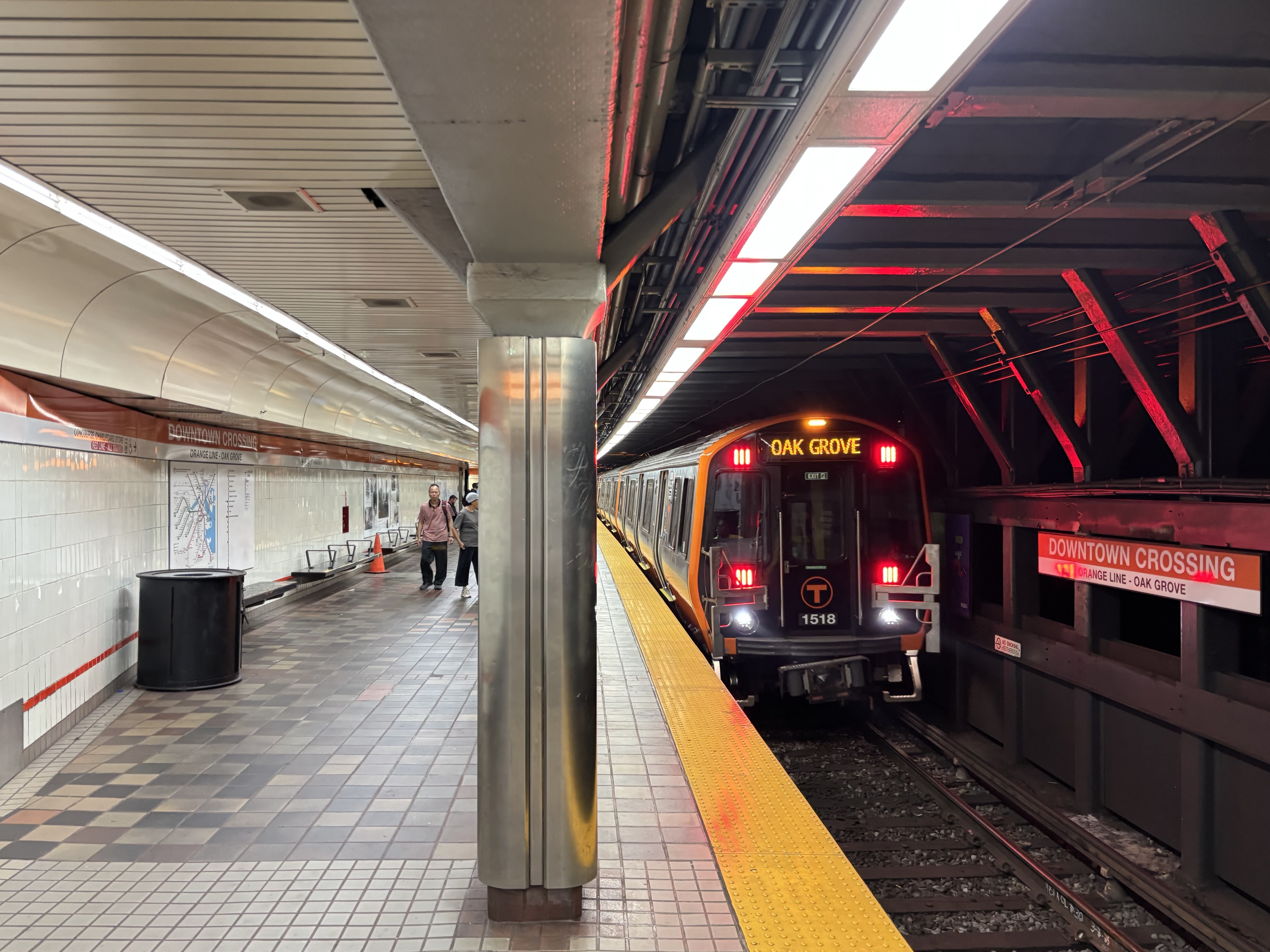
- A northbound Orange Line train entering the station in 2025

General information
- Location: Summer Street at Washington Street; Boston, Massachusetts
- Coordinates: 42.35550°N 71.06050°W
- Lines: Washington Street Tunnel; Cambridge-Dorchester Tunnel
- Platforms: 2 side platforms (Orange Line); 2 side platforms (Red Line)
- Tracks: 2 (Orange Line); 2 (Red Line)
- Connections: MBTA bus: 7, 11, 501, 504, 505; Green Line and MBTA bus 43 at Park Street (via Winter Street Concourse)

Construction
- Structure type: Underground
- Platform levels: 2
- Accessible: Yes

History
- Opened: November 30, 1908 (Orange Line); April 4, 1915 (Red Line); July 24, 2002 (Silver Line)
- Former names: Washington (Red Line, 1915–1987; Orange Line, 1967–1987); Winter–Summer (Orange Line, 1908–1967)

Passengers
- FY2019: 24,074 daily boardings

Services
Preceding station	MBTA	Following station
Chinatown toward Forest Hills	Orange Line	State toward Oak Grove
Park Street toward Alewife	Red Line	South Station toward Ashmont or Braintree
Boylston toward Nubian	Silver Line SL5	Terminus
Chinatown One-way operation	Silver Line SL5	Terminus
Track layout
- SL5 is omitted
Location

Downtown Crossing station (often known as DTX) is an underground Massachusetts Bay Transportation Authority (MBTA) rapid transit station located in the Downtown Crossing retail district in the downtown core of Boston, Massachusetts. It is served by the Orange Line and Red Line, and is one of four "hub stations" on the MBTA subway system. Downtown Crossing is also a major bus transfer location serving 13 MBTA bus routes, including one Silver Line route. It is the second busiest subway station in the MBTA network (behind only South Station), with an average of 24,074 entries per weekday in FY2019.

The Washington Street Tunnel carrying the Main Line (later the Orange Line) opened in 1908, with platforms called Summer and Winter. The Dorchester Tunnel carrying the Cambridge–Dorchester Line (now the Red Line) opened in 1915, with its station called Washington. The MBTA renamed the whole station complex as Washington in 1967, then Downtown Crossing in 1987. Major renovations took place in the 1970s and 1980s. Silver Line service began in 2002.

== Station layout ==
Downtown Crossing has two underground platform levels, each with two side platforms. The upper level serves the Orange Line and stretches from Temple Place to Franklin Street under Washington Street. A concourse from Washington Street to Chauncey Street under Summer Street includes entrances to several retail stores and formerly housed the Charliecard Store. The lower-level platforms, under the concourse, serve Red Line trains. The Winter Street Concourse, which connects to the southbound Orange Line platform, allows access to the Green Line at Park Street without leaving the common paid area.

Downtown Crossing is a terminal for several MBTA bus routes. Four routes – 7, 501, 504, and 505 – stop on Otis Street at Summer Street, a short block east of the nearest subway entrance. Route 11 stops on Bedford Street at Kingston Street, an additional block to the south. Silver Line route SL5 serves Downtown Crossing at a midblock bus stop on Temple Place, half a block from the nearest subway entrance.

=== Accessibility ===
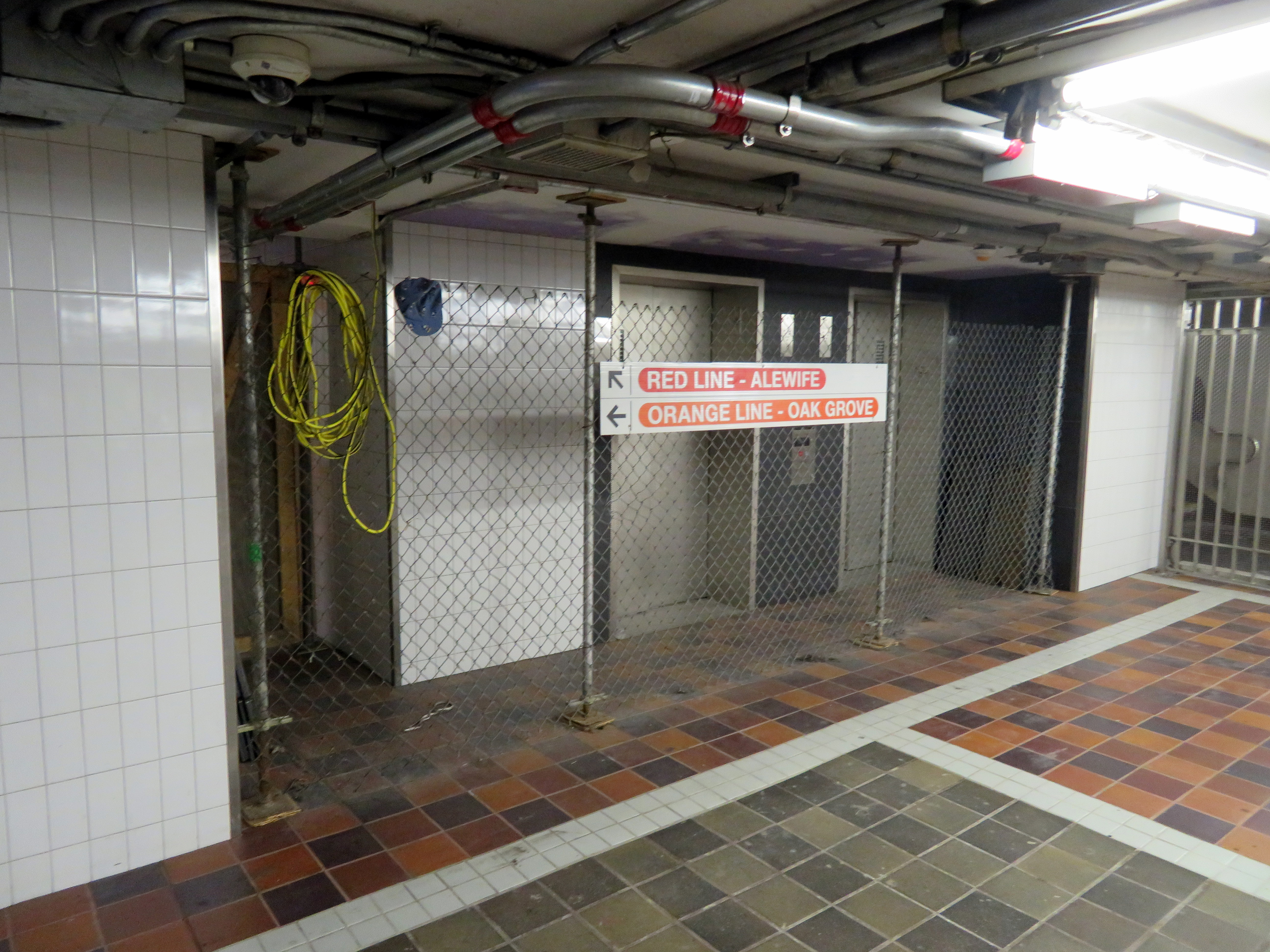
New elevators under construction in 2018

Like all Orange Line and Red Line stations, Downtown Crossing is accessible. Surface elevators are located at the Winter Street, Franklin Street, and Hawley Street entrances. An additional elevator – open business hours only – leads to the Roche Brothers store which connects to the Summer Street concourse. Because Downtown Crossing is an older station built at two different times in a dense urban area, transfers between the two lines are convoluted. There is no elevator between either of the Red Line platforms and the southbound Orange Line platform; passengers making such transfers must use the Winter Street Concourse and the Red Line elevators at Park Street.

The northbound Red Line platform has elevators at both ends of the Summer Street concourse for connections to the northbound Orange Line and to the street. The southbound Red Line platform only has an elevator at its far east end; passengers transferring to and from the northbound Orange Line must leave fare control at one end of the concourse and reenter at the other end.

A $13.57 million project added the two elevators connecting the northbound Orange Line platform to the northbound Red Line platform. Notice to proceed was given on February 18, 2016; completion was originally expected in late 2017, but delayed until June 14, 2019.

Phase II will add an elevator between the northbound Orange Line and southbound Red Line platforms, enlarge and extend the elevator from Winter Street to the southbound Orange Line platform to also serve the southbound Red Line, and relocate the Red Line elevator at Park Street. A $6.9 million design contract was awarded in March 2020. The Phase II improvements, which will complete elevator connections for all transfers, are part of the 2006 settlement of Joanne Daniels-Finegold, et al. v. MBTA. Original plans in that settlement for an elevator between the northbound Red Line and southbound Orange Line were found to be infeasible; as part of a 2018 amendment to the settlement, the relocation of the Park Street elevator was substituted.

Design was completed for the three elevators by June 2024. Bidding for a construction manager at risk for an estimated $95 million contract, including the Downtown Crossing and Park Street elevators plus similar work at Central, opened in April 2025. Construction was expected to last from April 2026 to January 2031. Notice to proceed was given in September 2025. As of October 2026, the portion of the construction at Downtown Crossing is expected to begin in 2027; the Winter Street elevator will take two years and the new elevator three years.

== History ==
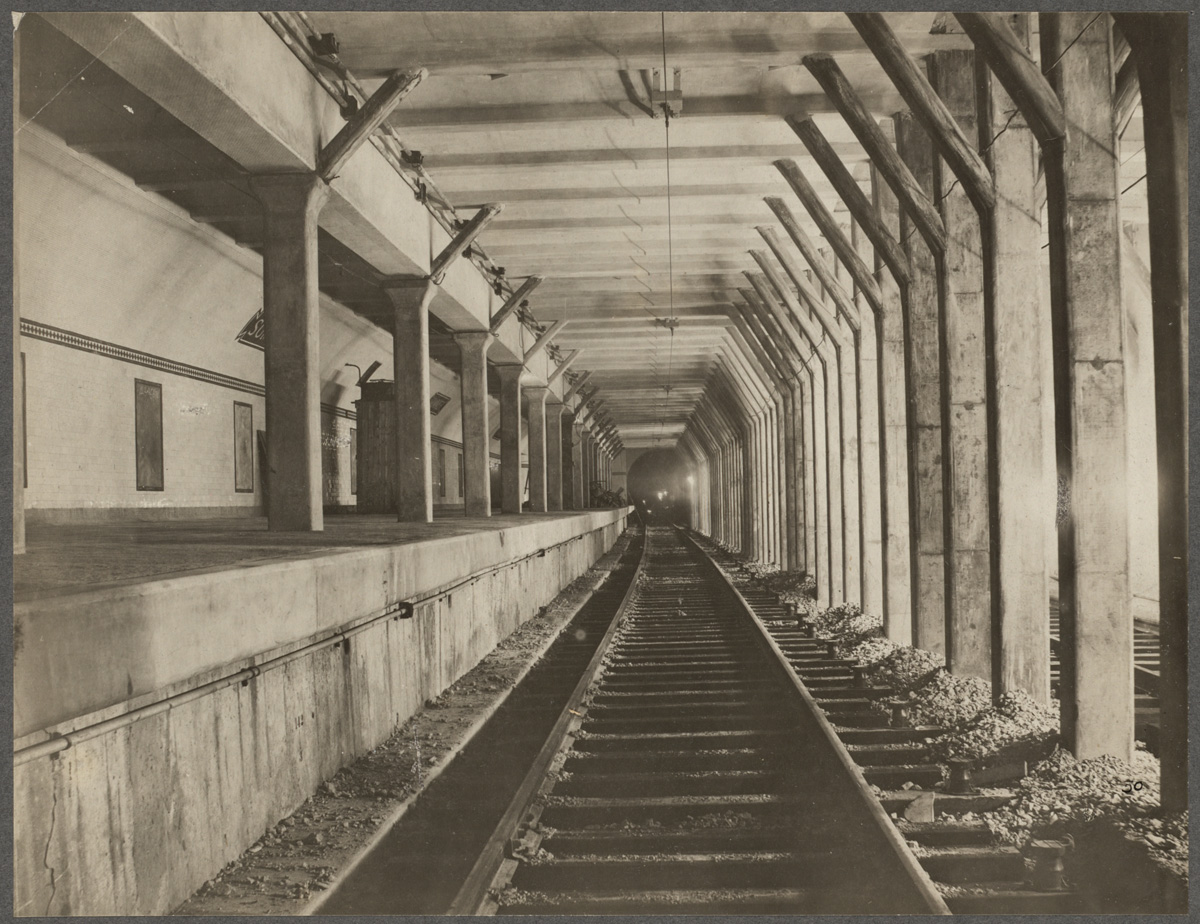
Summer station under construction in July 1908, five months before opening

The Washington Street Tunnel carrying the Main Line Elevated (later the Orange Line) opened on November 30, 1908. Stations on the tunnel were built in pairs with different names and separate entrances, an appeasement to merchants on the street who desired maximal pedestrian traffic. Stations were located at Summer northbound with entrances at Summer Street and Franklin Street, and Winter southbound with entrances at Winter Street and Temple Place. The Dorchester extension of the Cambridge Tunnel (now the Red Line) was built one level below the Washington Street Tunnel. Washington station opened on April 4, 1915, with additional entrances on Summer Street at Hawley Street and Chauncey Street.

As part of a system-wide rebranding by the newly formed MBTA, on January 23, 1967, the Orange Line platforms were renamed Washington as well. On May 3, 1987, the name was changed again to Downtown Crossing after the surrounding retail district, with Washington as a secondary name. The renaming, which had been approved in 1985 as part of a series of station name changes, was coordinated with the opening of the Southwest Corridor.

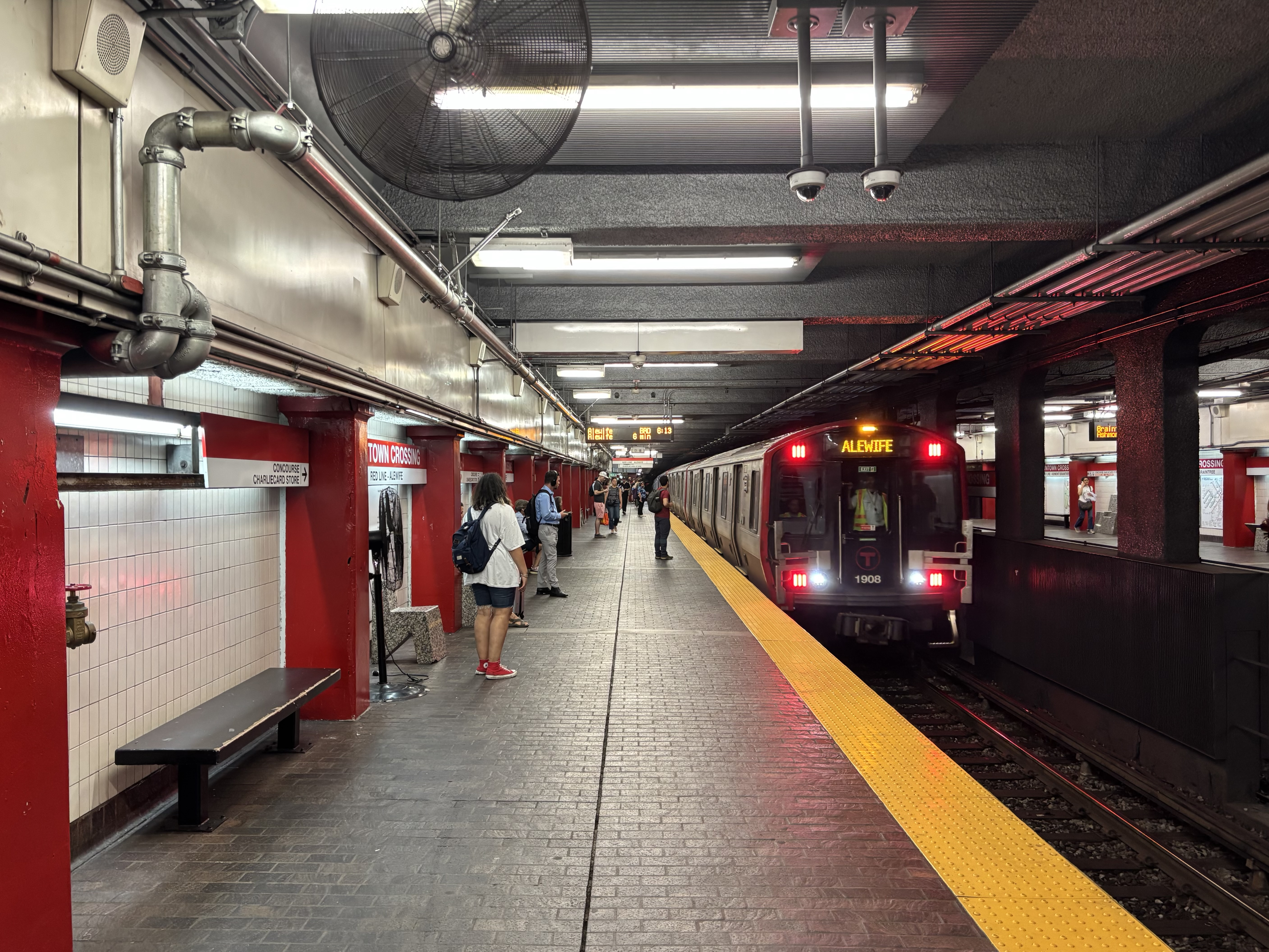
The Red Line platforms at Downtown Crossing station were originally named "Washington".

The 1970s saw the first major renovations to the station in decades. In 1972, the agency received a federal grant that funded two-thirds of a $14.3 million modernization program for downtown stations, including $2 million for Washington station. As part of that project, the MBTA investigated the feasibility of connecting Essex, Park Street, Washington, and State with pedestrian tunnels. The stairways between the Summer Street Concourse and the Orange Line platforms were reconfigured.

The Franklin Street entrance was originally inside a building on the north side of the street. The construction of the 350 Washington Street building beginning in 1965 demolished the older building and widened the street. A rebuilt entrance slightly to the north was incorporated into the new building. It was later replaced by a freestanding headhouse, approximately at the original location, in Shopper's Park. The MBTA proposed to make the headhouse exit-only during budget cuts in 1981. On August 10, 2015, the entrance was temporarily closed for construction of the Millennium Tower, which constructed a new sloping seating area over the entrance. The renovated headhouse reopened on September 12, 2016.

Originally, the Orange Line level had an underground concourse with several direct access points to basement entrances of various stores in the district, such as Jordan Marsh (now Macy's) and the former Filene's department store. It was modernized in 1978 with a new fare collection area added. In 1979, the Winter Street Concourse was opened, connecting the upper level of Downtown Crossing station (inside fare control) to the upper level of Park Street station two blocks away, utilizing an existing but previously unopened section of the concourse. Both levels of the station were substantially renovated and accessibility was improved in the mid-1980s. The 101 Arch Street building, completed in 1989, included access to the Summer Street concourse (including an elevator) through its basement level. By 1991, a 1914-installed wooden escalator in the station was the oldest operating escalator in the world.

Modernization in the 1980s included the installation of Situations, a set of 31 skewed marble seats designed by Buster Simpson along the Red Line platform. During the renovations, temporary artworks were displayed as part of the Arts on the Line program. One work on the Orange Line level, a take on Invasion of the Body Snatchers, featured 'alien' eggs that grew and eventually hatched 'aliens' portrayed by costumed actors. In August 1987, the MBTA board approved plans for an MBTA Transit Police substation in the Summer Street Concourse. The $950,000 substation opened on July 26, 1988.

Silver Line service from Downtown Crossing to Dudley Square began on July 24, 2002. The Temple Place exit from the southbound Orange Line platform was reopened to allow easier transfers. It was converted to an entrance around 2007 when automated fare collection was installed at the station. On June 24, 2019, the MBTA Board awarded a $29.7 million, 16-month contract for full cleaning, wayfinding signage replacement, and other improvements at North Station, Haymarket, State, and Downtown Crossing stations. The work was completed in June 2021. The entire Orange Line, including the Orange Line platforms at Downtown Crossing station, was closed from August 19 to September 18, 2022, during maintenance work.

=== CharlieCard Store ===
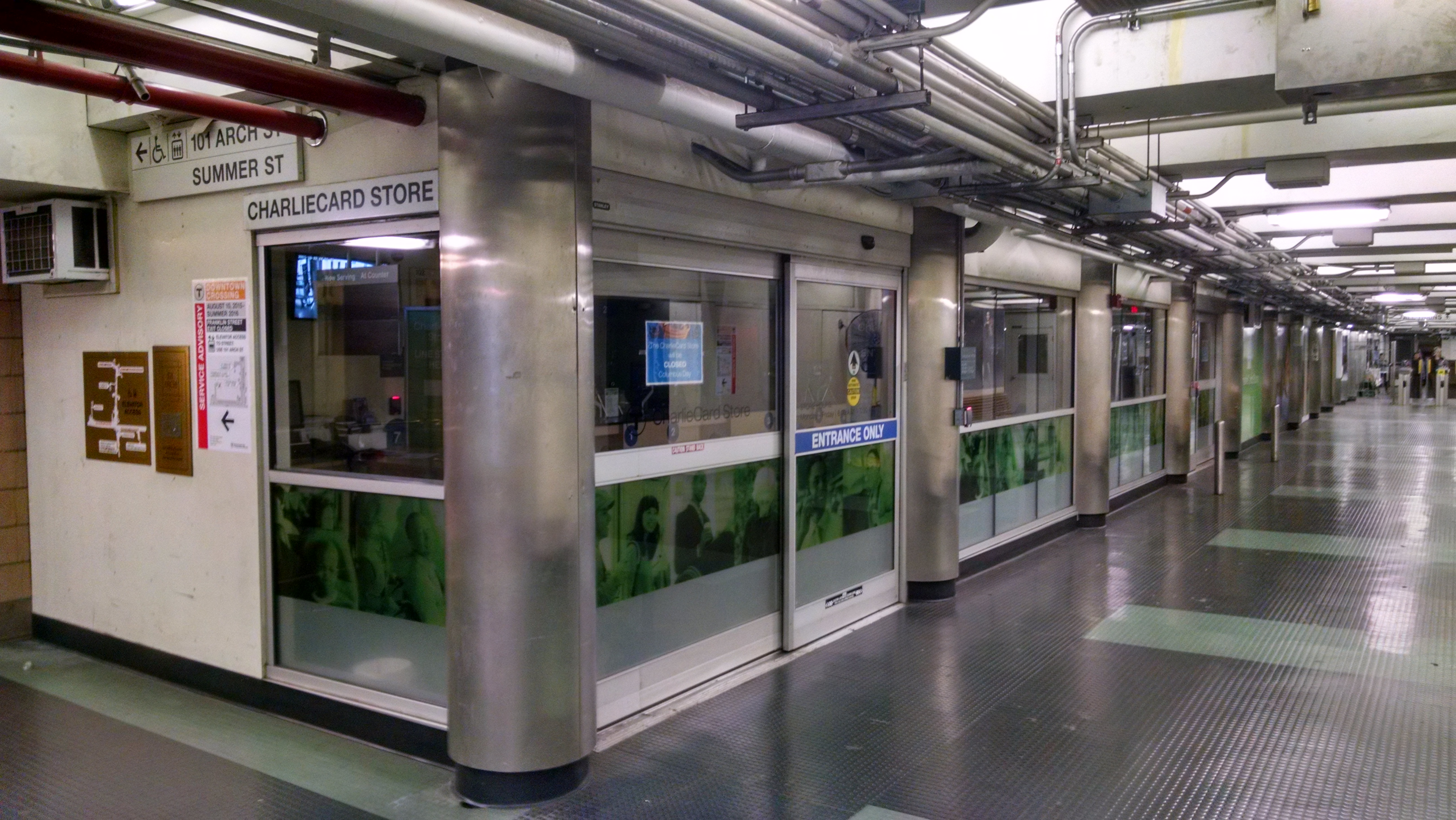
The former CharlieCard Store at the station in 2015

The MBTA began selling monthly passes in late 1978. A sales office for the passes was opened in the Summer Street concourse outside fare control on December 26, 1978. On August 13, 2012, the MBTA merged reduced-fare ticketing customer services (formerly located in a booth at Back Bay station) and the pass sales counter into a new "CharlieCard Store" at the Downtown Crossing location. The store was located inside an air-conditioned room in the concourse. It provided services including obtaining special passes for blind, senior, disabled, and other users; transferring value between fare media; and conventional pass purchases. Due to unreliable computer systems and high demand, the store initially experienced long wait times. The store was closed on July 17, 2023, due to an air conditioning failure; a temporary location opened on July 27 in the State Transportation Building. The new permanent "Charlie Service Center" opened near State station on July 29, 2024.
