= MBTA accessibility =

Aspect of transit system in Massachusetts

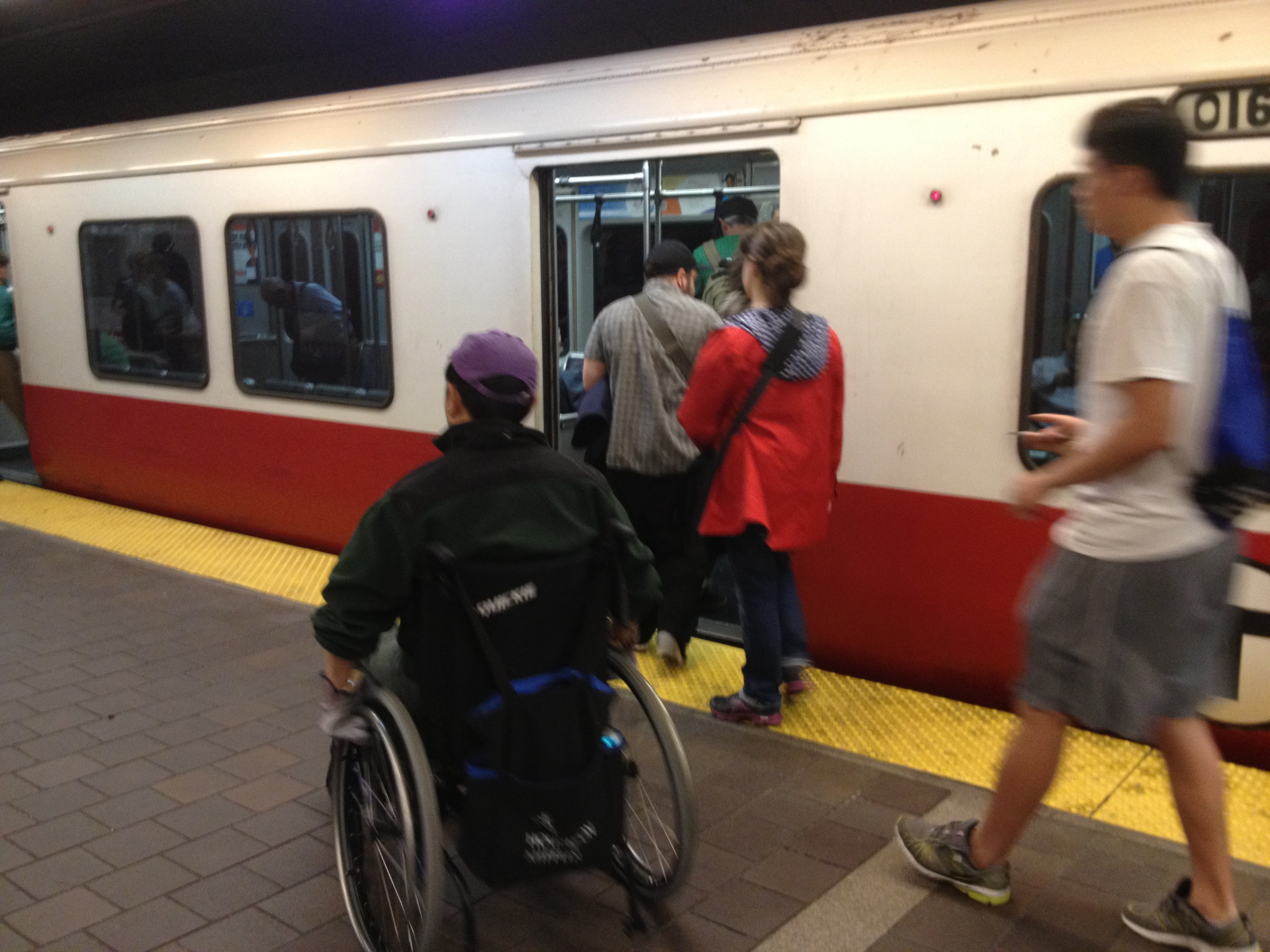
Wheelchair user entering a Red Line car at Harvard station

The Massachusetts Bay Transportation Authority (MBTA) system is mostly, but not fully, accessible. Like most American mass transit systems, much of the MBTA subway and commuter rail were built before wheelchair access became a requirement under the Americans with Disabilities Act of 1990. The MBTA has renovated most stations to be compliant with the ADA, and all stations built since 1990 are accessible. The MBTA also has a paratransit program, The Ride, which provides accessible vehicles to transport passengers who cannot use the fixed-route system.

Much of the MBTA subway system is accessible: all Orange and Red Line stations, and all but one Blue Line station, are accessible. Most of the underground portion of the Green Line is accessible, though only some surface stops are; all but one stop on the Mattapan Line are accessible. As of March 2025, about 84% of the MBTA Commuter Rail system is accessible, including the North Station and South Station terminals. All buses (including the Silver Line) and all MBTA ferry services are accessible.

== Subway ==
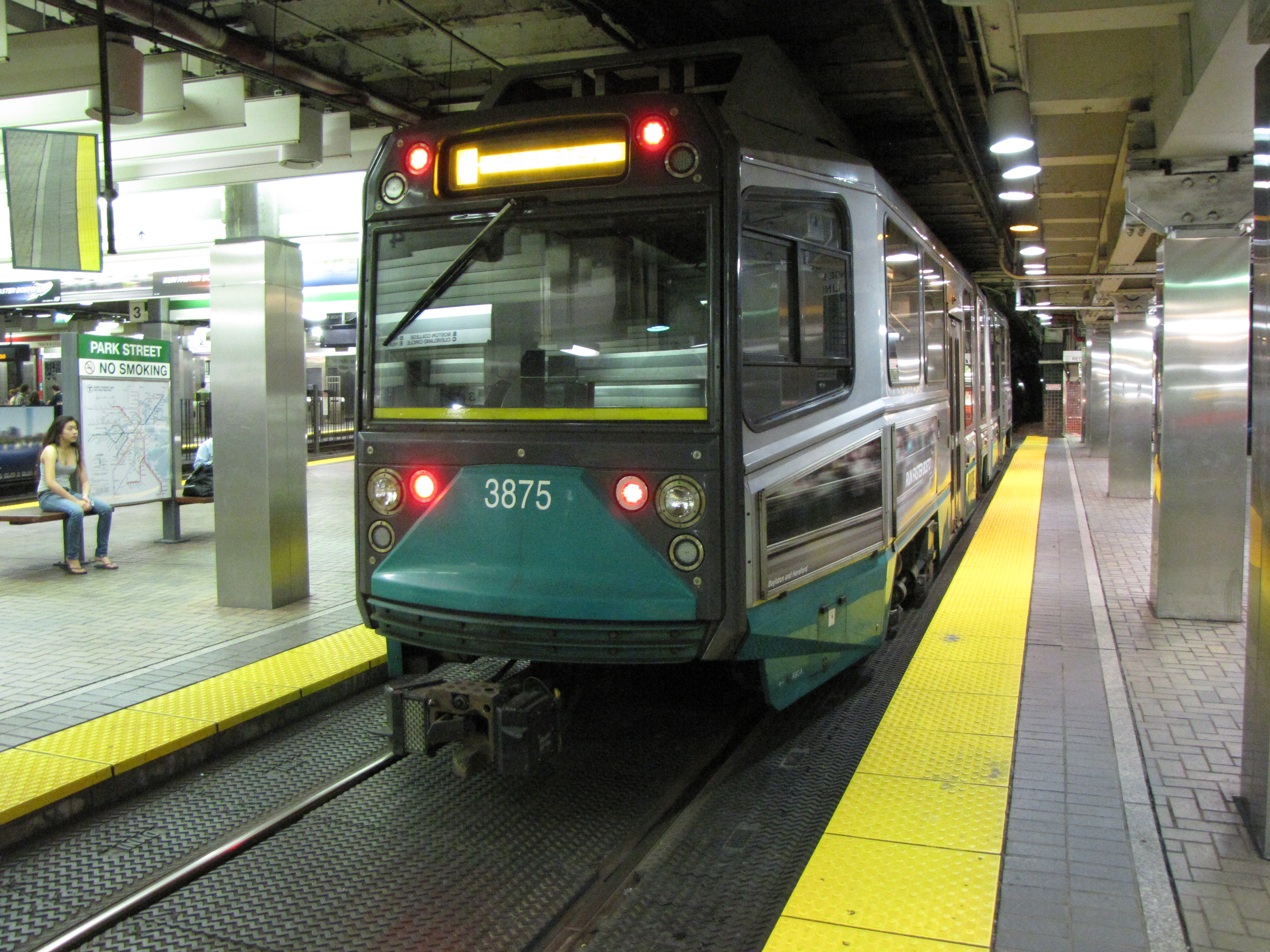
A Type 8 low-floor LRV at Park Street, which has raised platforms

All stations on the Orange Line, Blue Line, and Red Line rapid transit lines of the MBTA subway system have high level platforms level with train floors, and all are accessible except for Bowdoin station on the Blue Line.

Most subway stations (except Boylston, Symphony, and Hynes Convention Center) and major surface stops on the light rail Green Line have 8-inch (200 mm)-high platforms. These allow accessible boarding from the newer low-floor Type 8 and Type 9 vehicles, which have a built-in retractable bridge plate. Some stations have portable lifts or wooden wayside ramps for use with high-floor Type 7 vehicles; however, this boarding method is largely disused. The Mattapan Line runs older, high floor PCC streetcars. Wooden ramps with bridge plates are at all stations except for Valley Road, which is inaccessible because of a steep incline from street level. As of 2025, the MBTA expects all light rail stations except Boylston, Hynes Convention Center, and Valley Road to be accessible by 2030.

All subway transfer stations, and all stations that serve as major bus terminals, are accessible. Most have direct accessible transfers using elevators and short ramps, with some exceptions:

- Transfers between the Red Line and the southbound Orange Line at Downtown Crossing station require use of the Winter Street Concourse and the Park Street elevator, while transfers between the southbound Red Line and northbound Orange Line require leaving fare control. A three-phase project to add additional elevators will allow direct transfers.
- Harvard station has longer ramps connecting the Red Line platforms and busways to the lobby, allowing transfers without elevators. (Surface elevators connect to the lobby and the upper busway.)
- A long ramp connects the lower busway at Sullivan Square station with the upper busway and the Orange Line lobby.

== Commuter rail ==
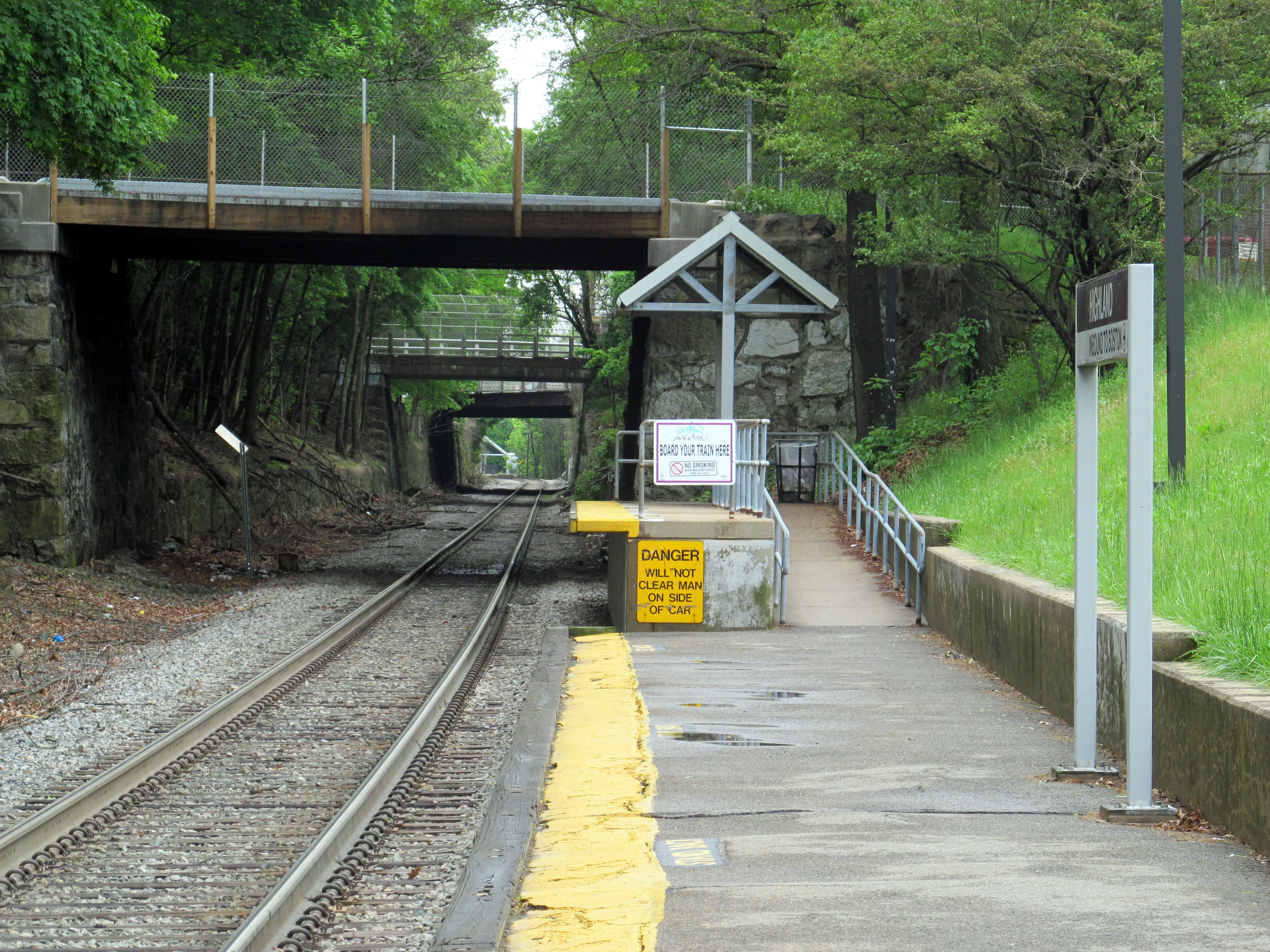
Accessible "mini-high" platform at Highland station on the Needham Line

As of July 2025, 122 out of 143 active MBTA Commuter Rail stations (85%) are accessible. Seven lines are entirely accessible: the Fairmount Line, Fall River/New Bedford Line, Greenbush Line, Kingston Line, Lowell Line, Needham Line, and Providence/Stoughton Line. The Newburyport/Rockport Line is accessible except for the private River Works station. Four lines have multiple non-accessible stations: the Fitchburg Line (8), Framingham/Worcester Line (5), Franklin/Foxboro Line (3), and Haverhill Line (4).

Of those stations that are accessible, some only have a short elevated platform that serves one or two cars. These "mini-high platforms" are usually located at the end of the station away from Boston, allowing them to be served by the car nearest the locomotive. They represent most accessible stations on the Franklin/Foxboro Line, Needham Line, Framingham/Worcester Line, Fitchburg Line, Lowell Line, Haverhill Line, and Newburyport/Rockport Line, as well as several stations on the Providence/Stoughton Line and Fairmount Line. Stations served only by the CapeFlyer service also have mini-high platforms.

Some commuter rail stations, mostly newer stations and those in larger cities, have full-length high-level platforms that allow for accessible boarding on all cars. (The standard MBTA high-level side platform is 12 feet wide and 800 feet long, capable of fully handling a 9-car train. Some stations, including Forest Hills and Route 128, have Amtrak-style 1050-foot 12-car platforms.) The MBTA builds full-length high-level platforms at most new stations, and ultimately plans to build full-length high-level platforms at most stations except those requiring clearance for freight trains. Full-length platforms allow automatic power doors to be used, which allows passengers to board at all doors and thus speeding boarding times. Full-length high-level platforms are in place at all stations on the Fall River/New Bedford Line, Greenbush Line, and Kingston Line.

== Blind and visually impaired ==
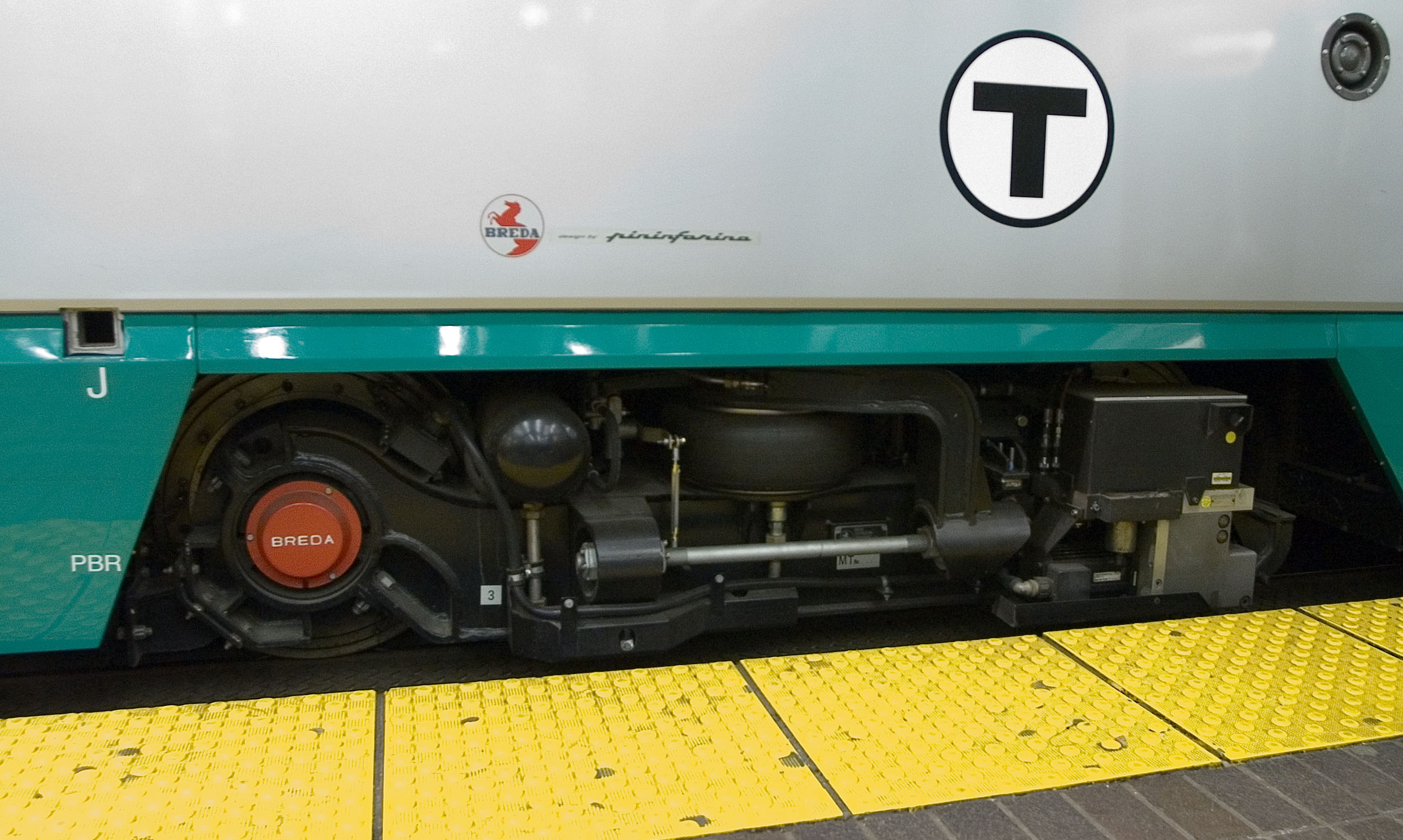
Tactile strip on the edge of a Green Line platform

According to MBTA policies, "Customers who use service animals are welcome in all MBTA vehicles, stations, and facilities during all hours of operation. Customers must be in control of their service animal at all times. Animals are not permitted in seats."

Some train stations have yellow detectable warning strips with truncated domes running in a two-foot (60 cm) band along the edge of the platforms. Most Red, Orange, and Blue Line stations have these tactile strips; however, many less-used Green Line surface stops and commuter rail stations lack them.

Buses and trains are supposed to have either recorded announcements or driver announcements of station stops, but these announcements are sometimes muffled, inaudible, or omitted by automated systems. In the event that automated systems are not functioning properly, the vehicle driver or conductor is to announce stops over the public address system.

== Hearing impaired ==
The MBTA has a TTY number for "T" information: (617) 222–5146. Many stations have TTY pay phones; the MBTA web site has a list.

The MBTA says it has reviewed its web site using "the United States Section 508 guidelines and WCAG double AA guidelines, ... and made all required accommodations to help ensure that the site is accessible by users who rely on assistive technologies such as screen readers or other input mechanisms."

== History ==
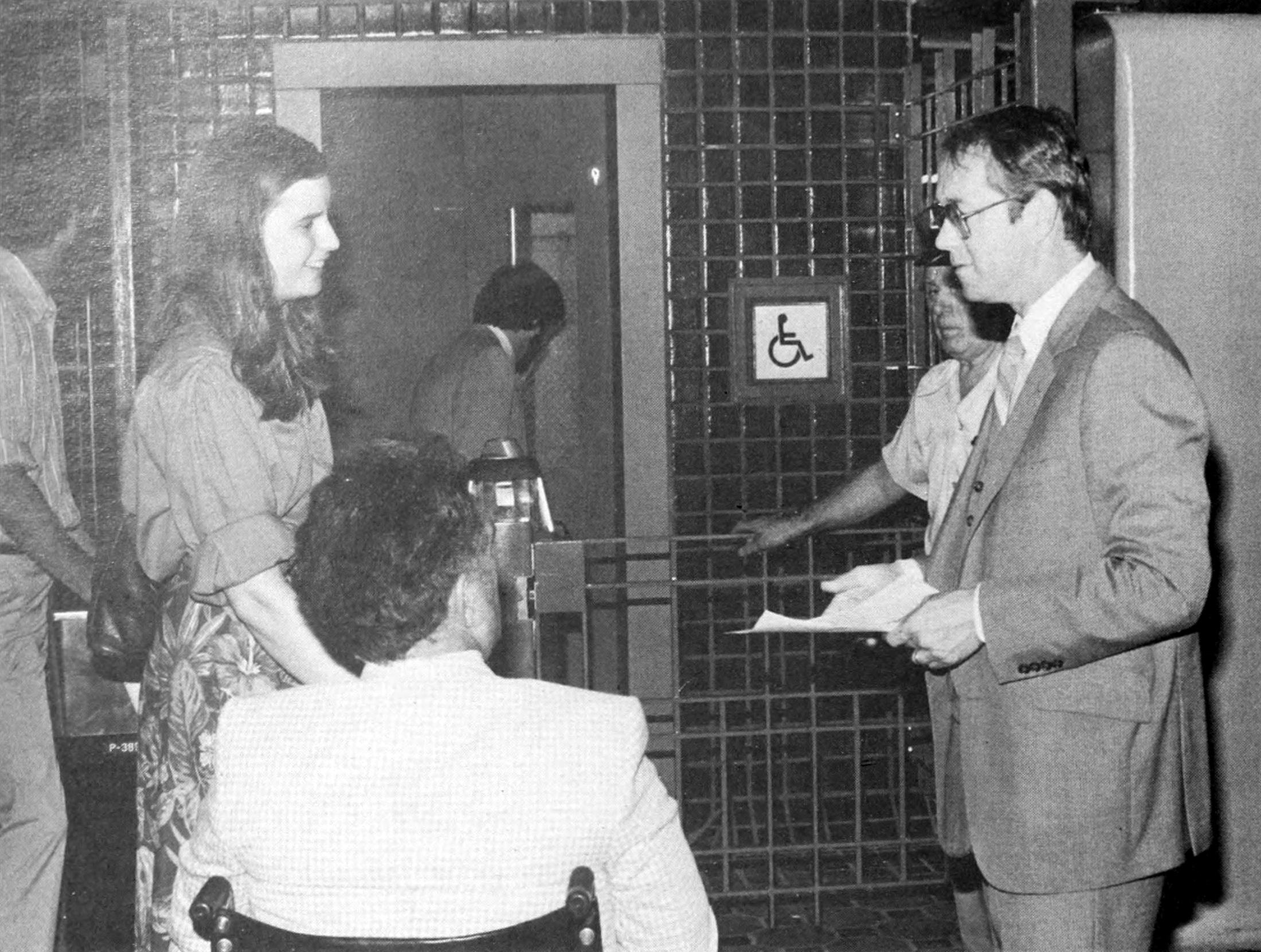
Newly opened elevator at Park Street station in 1979

In 1975, the Massachusetts Architectural Access Board enacted its first regulations requiring accessibility of public facilities. All subsequent new rapid transit stations have been accessible. The first station to be renovated for accessibility was the Red Line level of Park Street in 1979. In the mid-1980s, the MBTA spent $80 million to extend the platforms of seven Red Line and three Orange Line stations to allow the use of six-car trains and add elevators.

The pace of renovations increased after the 1990 Americans with Disabilities Act. Only 26 of the 80 key stations were accessible by 1990; $1.6 billion in renovations raised this to 69 in 2004. Of all stations, 2% were accessible in 1980, 21% in 1990, 48% in 2000, 70% in 2010, and 75% in 2020.

Green Line service was not accessible until around 2001, when key surface stops were retrofitted with raised platforms for use with new Type 8 LRVs. In 2006, the MBTA settled a class-action lawsuit, Joanne Daniels-Finegold, et al. v. MBTA, under which the agency agreed to add redundant elevators to a number of rapid transit stations and make other accessibility improvements. The settlement was amended in 2018 to better define certain terms. In December 2025, the independent monitor declared the MBTA to be in substantial compliance with the settlement. The MBTA entered into a continued accessibility agreement with the original plaintiffs. As of 2025, the MBTA expects 93% of stations to be accessible by 2030.

== See also ==
- Accessibility of the Metropolitan Transportation Authority, New York
- Accessibility of transport in London
- Toronto Transit Commission accessibility
