= Exchange Place (Boston) =

Skyscraper in Boston

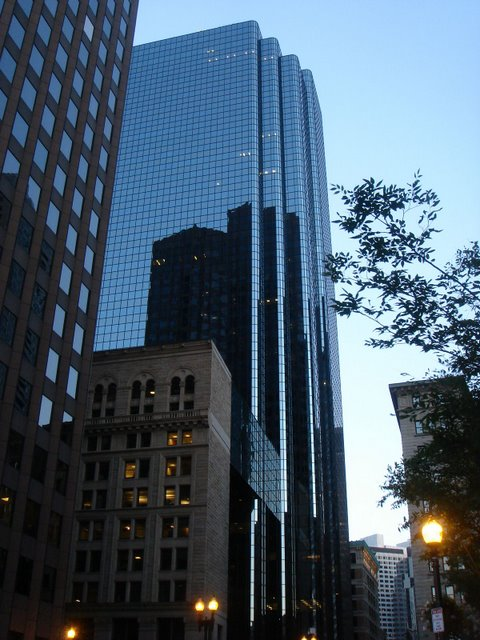
- Exchange Place at dusk
- Interactive map of the Exchange Place area

General information
- Type: Office
- Location: 53 State Street, Boston, Massachusetts
- Coordinates: 42.35832°N 71.05645°W
- Completed: 1984

Height
- Roof: 510 ft (160 m)

Technical details
- Floor count: 40
- Floor area: 1,121,599 sq ft (104,200.0 m^{2})
- Lifts/elevators: 24

Design and construction
- Architect: WZMH Architects
- Developer: Brookfield Properties

Other information
- Public transit: Blue Line Orange Line State MBTA bus: 4, 92, 93, 354

Boston Landmark
- Designated: January 2, 1980 (Stock Exchange Building)

Exchange Place is a modern skyscraper located at the block of 43–53 State Street or 1 Exchange Place, between Congress and Kilby Streets, in the Financial District of Boston, Massachusetts. Built in 1981–1985, it is Boston's 18th tallest building, standing 510 feet (155 m) tall and containing 40 floors. The glass tower portion rises out of a previous building, the 12-story Boston Stock Exchange, built in 1889–1891 and designed by Peabody and Stearns. The intent was to demolish the older building in order to construct the skyscraper, but preservationists succeeded in rescuing a portion of the Stock Exchange's facade. The bank vault was designed by Frederick S. Holmes.

Brookfield Office Properties, which had previously purchased the building from Harold Theran in 2006, sold Exchange Place to UBS Realty Investors LLC in 2011. It is home to the Boston Consulting Group, advertising agency Hill Holliday, marketing agency Optaros, software company Acquia, Hachette Book Group, the Macquarie Group, The Blackstone Group, and AllianceBernstein. In June 2017, The Boston Globe moved into Exchange Place from its longtime headquarters on Morrissey Boulevard in Dorchester, Boston.

The original Exchange Building was designated a Boston Landmark by the Boston Landmarks Commission in 1980.

The building is inter-connected by Metro-Boston's district heating system helping it also achieve LEED Platinum and Energy Star Certification for energy conservation.

An Amalgamated Bank branch is at street level, with ATMs located at the intersection of Congress Street and State Street.

== Accessibility and transportation ==
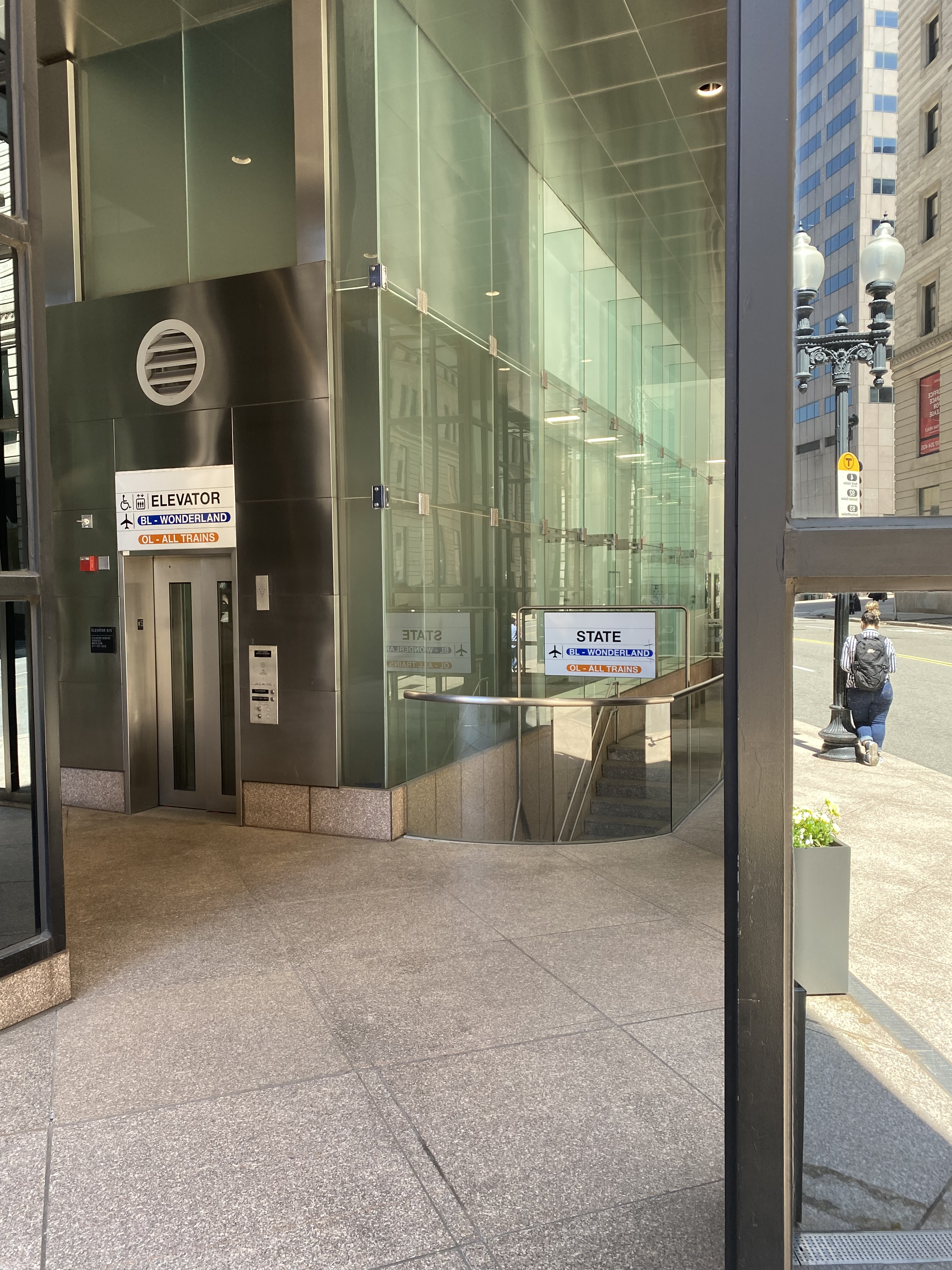
Stair and elevator access to the Boston subway on the Congress Street side.

Close to the southwestern corner of the building near the junction of Congress Street with Exchange Place, the building sits directly atop the State Street MBTA station, featuring direct access to the Blue-Line Wonderland-bound platform and by extension the Orange Line.

=== Bus connections ===
At the main entrance on Congress Street a number of MBTA bus routes stop adjacent to the building and entrance to State street station. These include local routes to Charlestown, and North Station.

- 4: North Station–Tide Street (Northbound only)
- 92: Sullivan Square station–Downtown via Main Street
- 93: Sullivan Square station–Downtown via Bunker Hill Street

== See also ==
- List of tallest buildings in Boston
