= Winter Street Concourse =

Pedestrian tunnel in Boston, Massachusetts

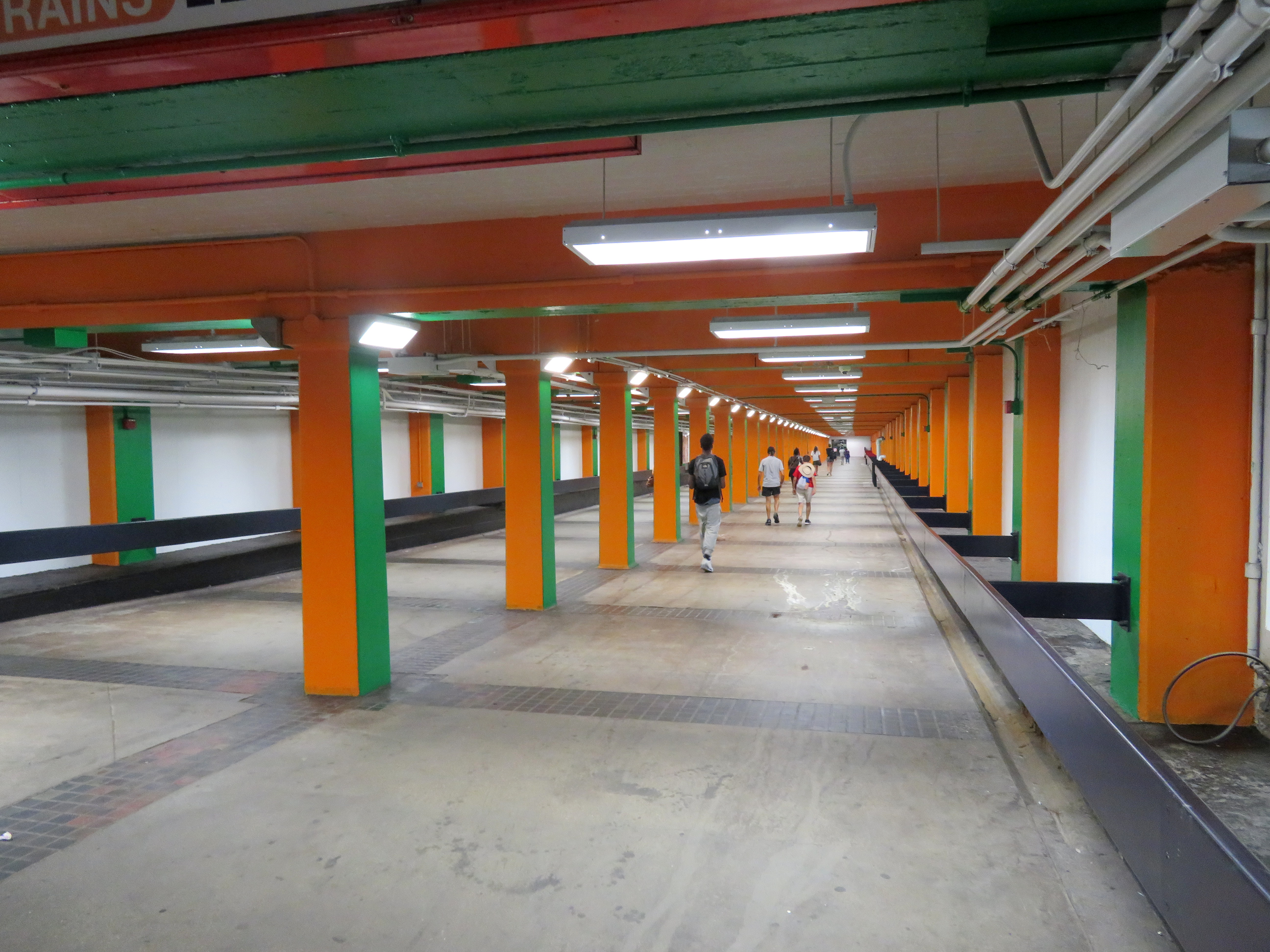
- View down the Winter Street Concourse towards Downtown Crossing in 2018
- Interactive map of Winter Street Concourse

Overview
- System: MBTA subway
- Crosses: Winter Street
- Start: Downtown Crossing (Summer Street and Washington Street, Boston)
- End: Park Street (Park Street and Tremont Street, Boston)
- No. of stations: 2

Operation
- Opened: March 9, 1979

Technical
- Length: 467 feet (142 m)
- Tunnel clearance: 11 feet (3.4 m)
- Width: 30 feet (9.1 m)

The Winter Street Concourse is a pedestrian tunnel connecting the upper levels of the Downtown Crossing and Park Street subway stations in Boston, Massachusetts. It facilitates movement between the Green and Orange rapid transit lines operated by the Massachusetts Bay Transportation Authority, and consequently alleviates congestion on the Red Line.

== History ==
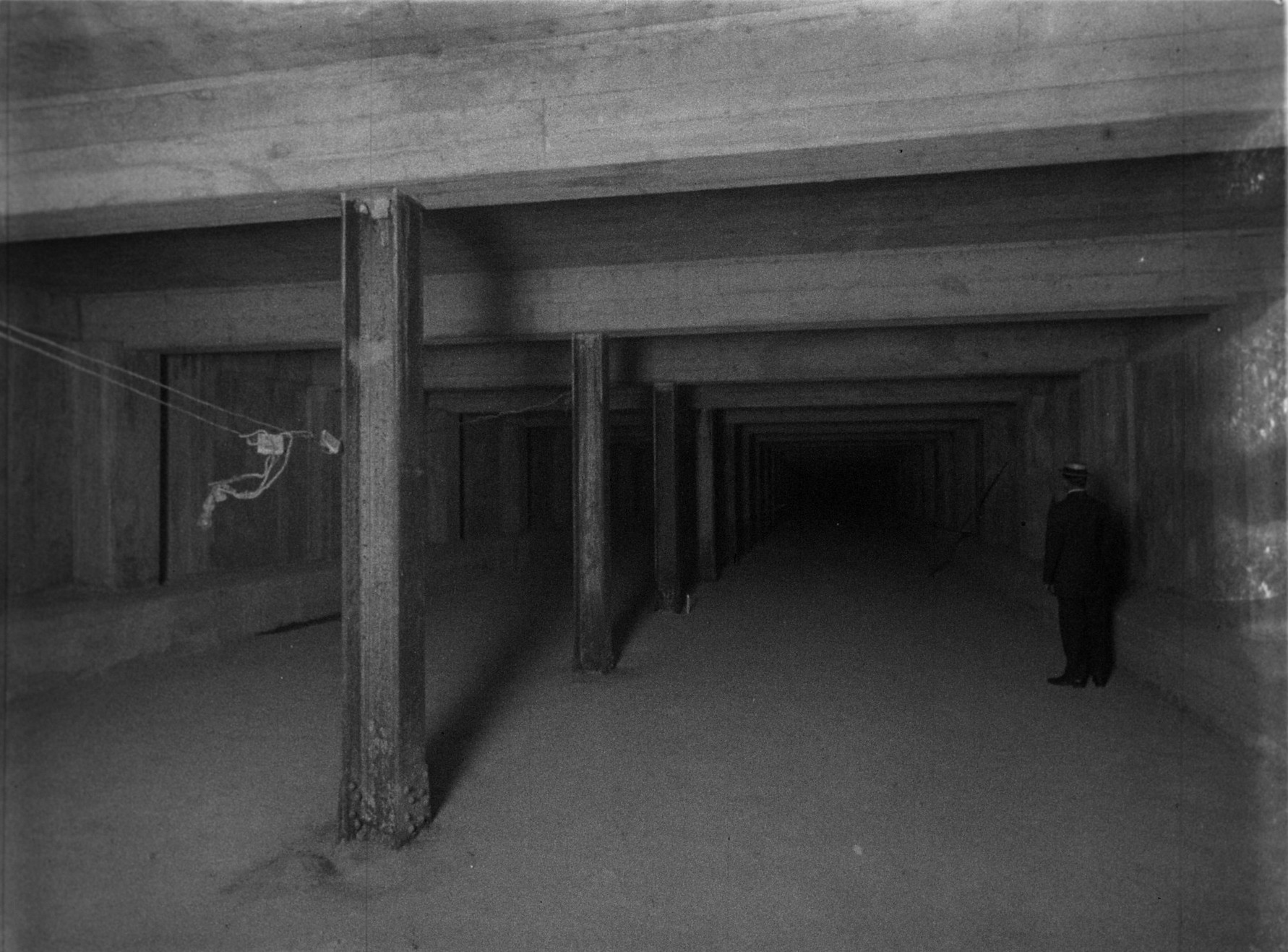
Upper level of the under-construction Winter Street Tunnel in July 1913

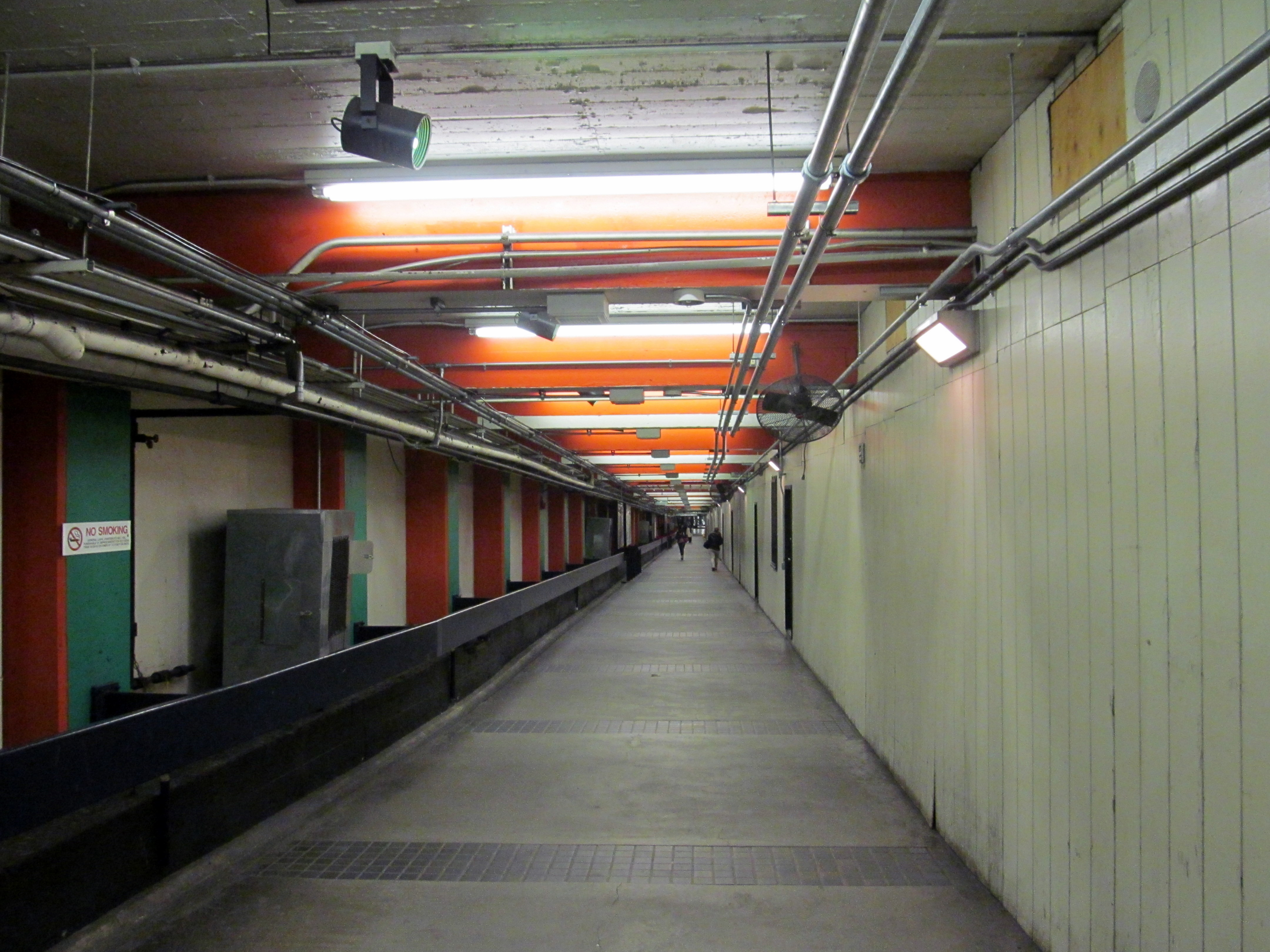
The tunnel in 2012 before the south half was renovated

The upper level of Park Street opened as part of the Tremont Street subway – a streetcar tunnel now carrying the Green Line – in September 1897. It was built as a cut-and-cover tunnel just below the surface of Tremont Street. From 1901 to 1908, the Main Line Elevated (now the Orange Line) shared the Tremont Street subway. In November 1908, the Main Line was moved to the parallel Washington Street tunnel under Washington Street. Similarly-constructed just below street level, it included a pair of one-way stations (Winter southbound and Summer northbound) one block southeast of Park Street.

In March 1912, the Cambridge subway (now the Red Line) opened from Harvard Square to Park Street Under, one level below the streetcar platforms at Park Street. The line was extended (as the Dorchester tunnel) to Washington (a lower level at Winter/Summer, now Downtown Crossing) in April 1915, and to South Station Under in December 1916. The cut-and-cover tunnel was constructed with two levels from Tremont Street until halfway between Otis Street and Devonshire Street. The bottom level carried rapid transit trains, while the upper level (at the height of the existing Tremont Street subway and Washington Street tunnel platforms) was constructed as a fare lobby above Washington station and a potential pedestrian passageway east and west of the station.

The section of upper level tunnel under Summer Street between Washington Street and Devonshire Street was used as planned as a fare lobby with entrances from Downtown Crossing department stores and as a turnstile repair area. The section between Tremont Street and Washington Street under Winter Street was leased as to adjoining businesses as storage space. In 1922 and 1927, it was proposed to be opened as a pedestrian passageway as part of expansion of Park Street station; the 1936-built expansion did not include the passageway. In 1960, the corridor was used for a temporary art exhibition – a forerunner of the Arts on the Line program.

On March 9, 1979, the Winter Street section was opened as an inside-fare-control pedestrian passageway to ease demand on the Red Line. A ticket counter was formerly located on the mezzanine level of Downtown Crossing station (outside fare control) under Winter Street east of Washington Street. On August 13, 2012, the MBTA combined customer services (formerly located in a booth at Back Bay station) into the Downtown Crossing location as the "CharlieCard Store". When opened in 1979, only the north half of the tunnel width was open to pedestrians. In 2017-2018, both halves were renovated to create a wider, better-lit passage.
