= Eastern Avenue station =

Bus rapid transit station in Chelsea, Massachusetts, US

Eastern Ave
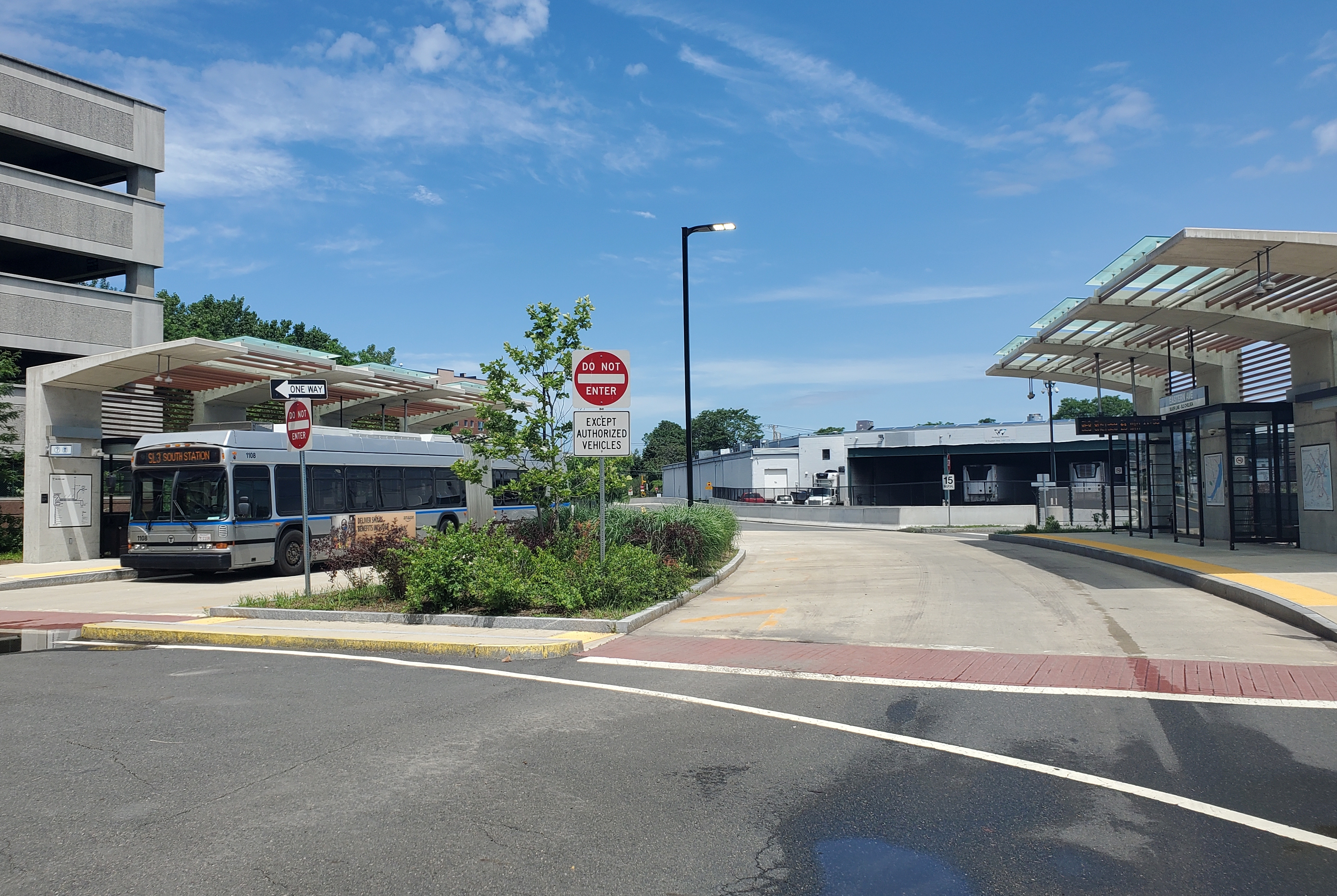
- An inbound bus at Eastern Avenue station in July 2021

General information
- Location: Eastern Avenue at Central Avenue; Chelsea, Massachusetts
- Coordinates: 42.388453°N 71.023984°W
- Line: Silver Line busway
- Platforms: 2 side platforms
- Connections: MBTA bus: 104, 112

Construction
- Parking: No
- Cycle facilities: None
- Accessible: Yes

History
- Opened: April 21, 2018

Services
Preceding station	MBTA	Following station
Box District toward Chelsea	Silver Line SL3	Airport toward South Station
Location

Eastern Avenue station is a bus rapid transit station on the Massachusetts Bay Transportation Authority (MBTA) Silver Line system, located in Chelsea, Massachusetts near Chelsea Creek. The accessible station has two side platforms, with street access from Eastern Avenue and Central Avenue. Plans for the Urban Ring Project called for a busway along the former Grand Junction Branch, but with a station further north at Griffin Way. After the Urban Ring was cancelled in 2010, new plans for a busway with an Eastern Avenue stop were announced in 2013. Construction began in 2015, with route SL3 service beginning on April 21, 2018.

== Station layout ==
The station is located east of downtown Chelsea, just west of Eastern Avenue and north of Central Street. The Silver Line busway runs roughly north-south through the station site; the Chelsea Greenway parallels the east side of the busway north of the station and terminates at Eastern Avenue. Two accessible side platforms with concrete canopies flank the busway, with a landscaped island separating the bus lanes. The south end of the station connects to a shuttle bus loop for a Massport employee garage. MBTA bus routes 104 and 112 run on Central Street, with stops near Eastern Avenue.

== History ==
The freight-only Grand Junction Railroad opened through Everett and Chelsea in 1852 to serve the East Boston docks. The Grand Junction tracks in Chelsea were largely unused after the Chelsea Creek bridge burned in 1955. In 2002, CSX Transportation began the process of abandoning the Grand Junction from 2nd Street through Chelsea to East Boston; the proceedings were delayed by negotiations with the city of Chelsea to acquire the right-of-way.

The MBTA planned to reuse the right-of-way for the Urban Ring Project – a planned circumferential bus rapid transit (BRT) line designed to connect the current radial MBTA rail lines. Under draft plans released in 2008, a dedicated busway was to be built from Griffin Way west through Chelsea along the right-of-way. A BRT stop was to be located on Griffin Way near Eastern Avenue, about 1,000 feet (300 m) north of Central Avenue. The project was shelved in January 2010 due to high costs.

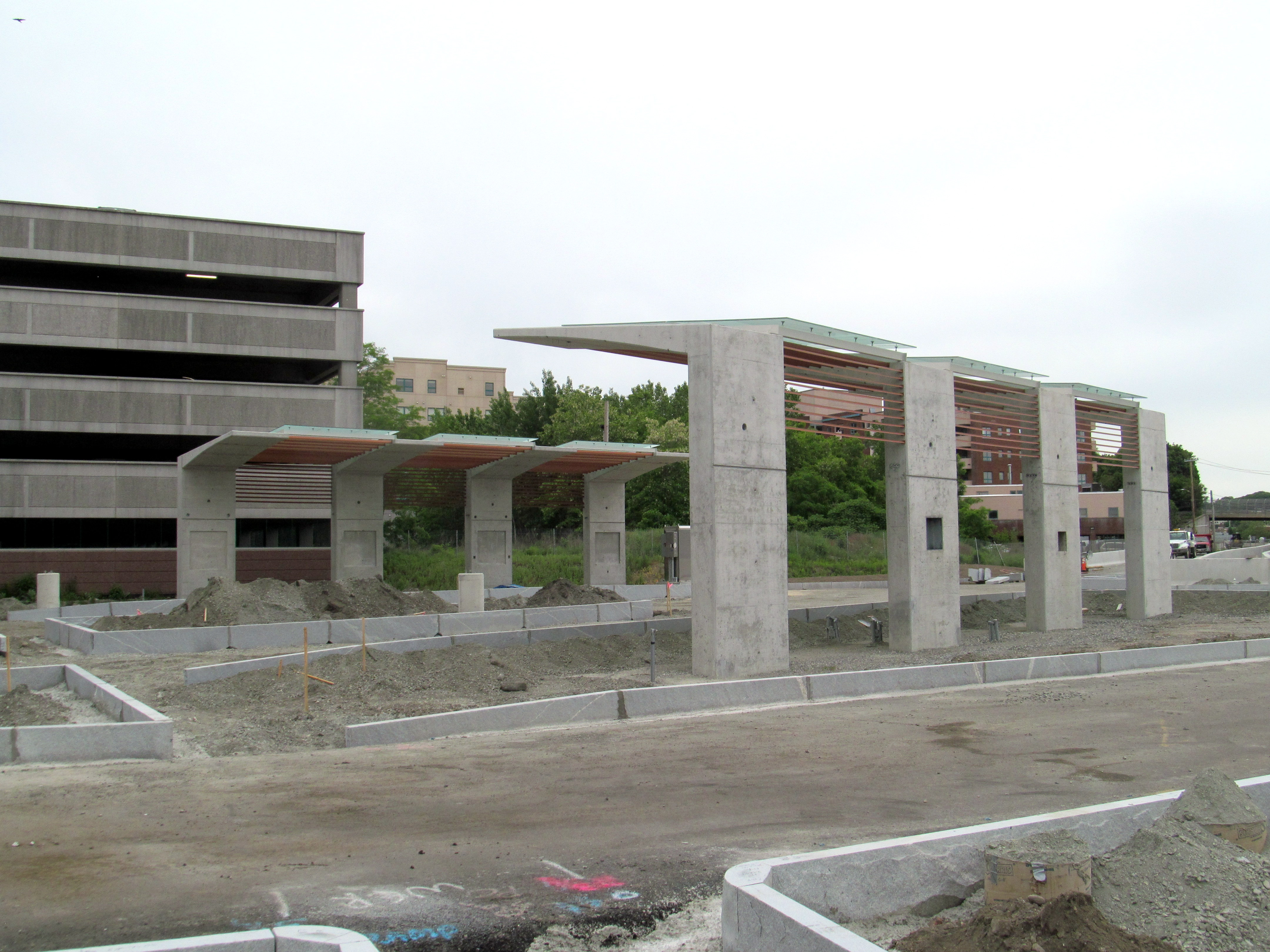
The station under construction in 2017

That June, the Massachusetts Department of Transportation (MassDOT) purchased the disused Grand Junction right-of-way from 2nd Street to East Boston, to be landbanked for future transportation use. Planning for some smaller corridors continued; the Chelsea–South Boston section was given high priority because Chelsea was densely populated yet underserved by transit. A 2011 state study analyzed potential Chelsea transit improvements, including a Silver Line branch or improvements to the route 112 bus. One Silver Line alternative followed the Urban Ring route to the Chelsea commuter rail station; the other ran on surface streets to Bellingham Square, with a stop on Central Avenue west of Eastern Avenue.

In March 2013, the MBTA began studying an extension of the Silver Line to Chelsea via a newly constructed bypass road in East Boston. Three alternatives were discussed for the Chelsea section. One would run up the disused section of the Grand Junction Railroad right-of-way from Eastern Avenue to Chelsea station with stops at Eastern Avenue, Highland/Box District, the existing Chelsea station, and Mystic Mall. The second alignment would follow the Grand Junction to just short of Bellingham Square, then diverge onto surface roads to the square. The third alignment would run largely on surface streets, serving two stops on Central Avenue and four stops along a loop serving the existing Chelsea station and the MGH Chelsea healthcare center near Mystic Mall. In September 2013, the MBTA indicated that it would pursue the first alternative despite potential issues with bridge clearances and rebuilding Chelsea station.

On October 30, 2013, MassDOT announced $82.5 million in state funding for construction of a modified version of the first alternative, with service expected to begin in late 2015. The Environmental Impact Report was issued in March 2014. A $33.8 million construction contract was approved in September 2014, and construction began in March 2015. By June 2017, opening had been pushed back to April 2018. Silver Line service to Chelsea on the SL3 route began on April 21, 2018.
