= Box District station =

Bus rapid transit station in Chelsea, Massachusetts

Box District
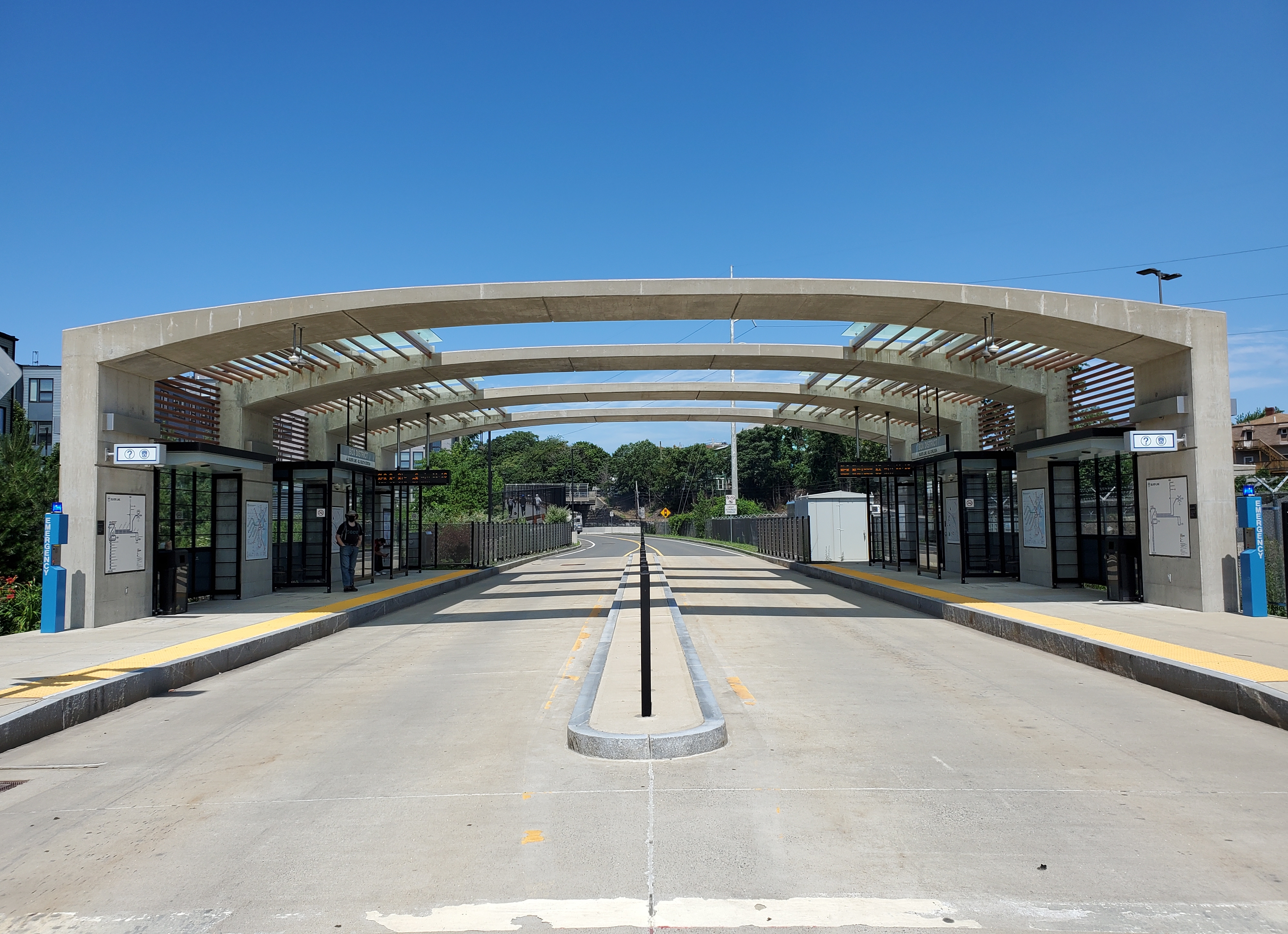
- Box District station in July 2021

General information
- Location: Highland Street near Gerrish Avenue; Chelsea, Massachusetts
- Coordinates: 42.39406°N 71.02840°W
- Line: Silver Line busway
- Platforms: 2 side platforms

Construction
- Parking: No
- Cycle facilities: None
- Accessible: Yes

History
- Opened: April 21, 2018

Services
Preceding station	MBTA	Following station
Bellingham Square toward Chelsea	Silver Line SL3	Eastern Avenue toward South Station
Location

Box District station is a bus rapid transit station on the Massachusetts Bay Transportation Authority (MBTA) Silver Line system, located in Chelsea, Massachusetts. The accessible station has two side platforms under an arched canopy, with street access from Broadway and from Highland Street. Plans for the Urban Ring Project called for a busway along the former Grand Junction Branch, but without a station in the Box District neighborhood. After the Urban Ring was cancelled in 2010, new plans for a busway with a Box District stop were announced in 2013. Construction began in 2015, with route SL3 service beginning on April 21, 2018.

== Station layout ==
Box District station is located northeast of downtown Chelsea near the north end of Highland Street. The Silver Line busway runs roughly northwest-southeast through the station site, with the Chelsea Greenway paralleling the south side of the busway. Two accessible side platforms flank the busway, with an arched concrete-and-glass canopy connecting the platforms. A crosswalk is located just east of the platforms to allow passengers to cross the busway. Primary access to the station is from the Chelsea Greenway, with street connections at Broadway 600 feet (180 m) to the west and Highland Street just to the east; a sidewalk also follows the north side of the busway southeast to Griffin Way.

== History ==
The freight-only Grand Junction Railroad opened through Everett and Chelsea in 1852 to serve the East Boston docks. The Grand Junction tracks in Chelsea were largely unused after the Chelsea Creek bridge burned in 1955. In 2002, CSX Transportation began the process of abandoning the Grand Junction from 2nd Street in Everett through Chelsea to East Boston; the proceedings were delayed by negotiations with the city of Chelsea to acquire the right-of-way.

The Massachusetts Bay Transportation Authority (MBTA) planned to reuse the right-of-way for the Urban Ring Project – a planned circumferential bus rapid transit (BRT) line designed to connect the current radial MBTA rail lines. Under draft plans released in 2008, a dedicated busway was to be built from Griffin Way west through Chelsea along the right-of-way. A BRT stop was to be located on Griffin Way near Eastern Avenue, about 1/3 mile (0.5 km) southeast of where Box District station was later built. The Urban Ring Project was shelved in January 2010 due to high costs.

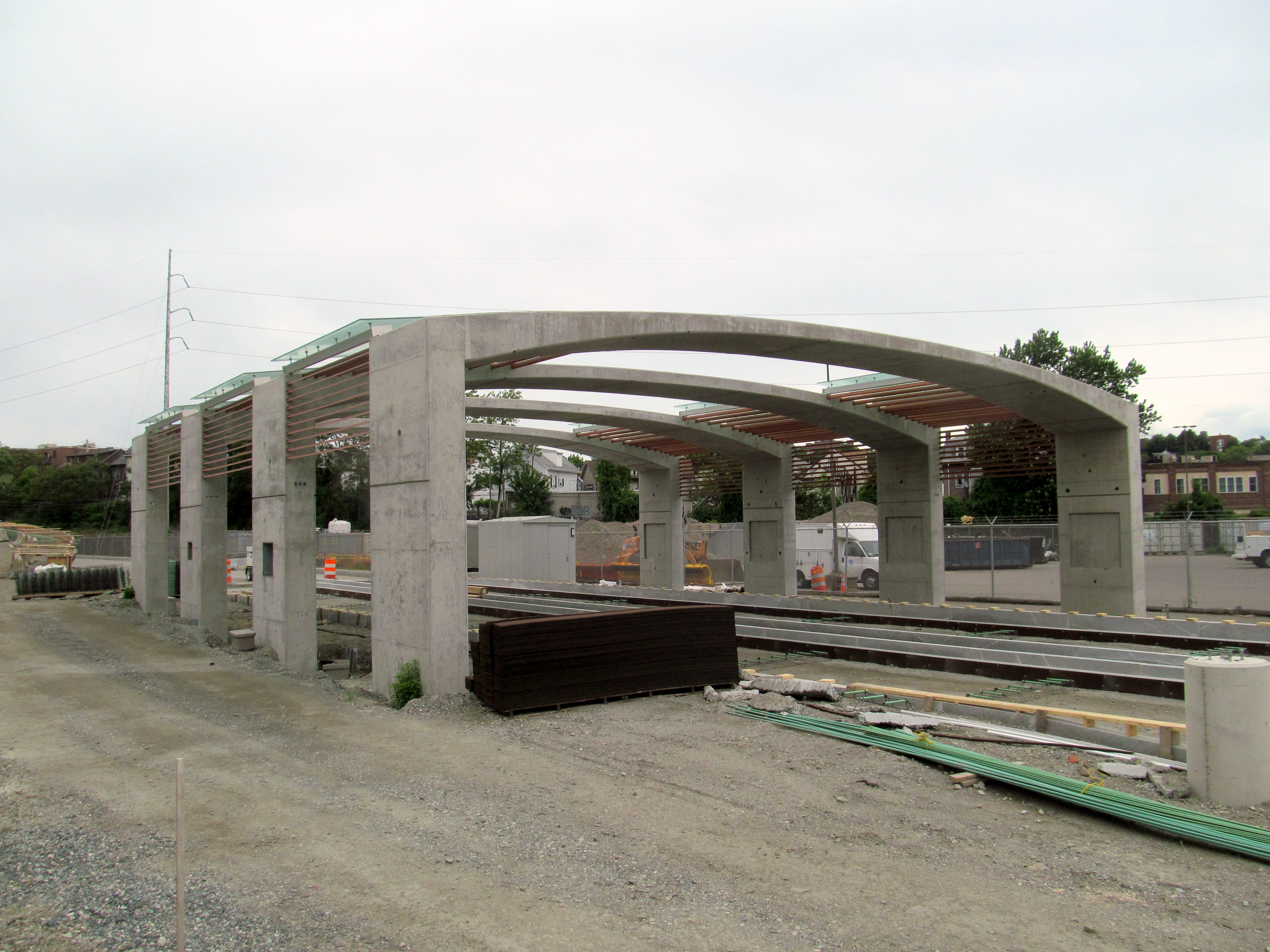
The station under construction in 2017

That June, the Massachusetts Department of Transportation (MassDOT) purchased the disused Grand Junction right-of-way from 2nd Street to East Boston, to be landbanked for future transportation use. Planning for some smaller corridors continued; the Chelsea–South Boston section was given high priority because Chelsea was densely populated yet underserved by transit. A 2011 state study analyzed potential Chelsea transit improvements, including a Silver Line branch or improvements to the route 112 bus. One Silver Line alternative followed the Urban Ring route to the Chelsea commuter rail station; the other ran on surface streets to the south.

In March 2013, the MBTA began studying an extension of the Silver Line to Chelsea via a newly constructed bypass road in East Boston. Three alternatives were discussed for the Chelsea section. One would run up the disused section of the Grand Junction Railroad right-of-way from Eastern Avenue to Chelsea station with stops at Eastern Avenue, Highland/Box District, the existing Chelsea station, and Mystic Mall. The second alignment would follow the Grand Junction to just short of Bellingham Square, then diverge onto surface roads to the square. The third alignment would run largely on surface streets, serving two stops on Central Avenue and four stops along a loop serving the existing Chelsea station and the MGH Chelsea healthcare center near Mystic Mall. In September 2013, the MBTA indicated that it would pursue the first alternative despite potential issues with bridge clearances and rebuilding Chelsea station.

On October 30, 2013, MassDOT announced $82.5 million in state funding for construction of a modified version of the first alternative, with service expected to begin in late 2015. The Environmental Impact Report was issued in March 2014. The $33.8 million main construction contract was approved in September 2014, and construction began in March 2015. By June 2017, the opening had been pushed back to April 2018. Silver Line service to Chelsea on the SL3 route began on April 21, 2018.
