= Chelsea station (MBTA) =

Intermodal transit station in Chelsea, Massachusetts, US

Chelsea
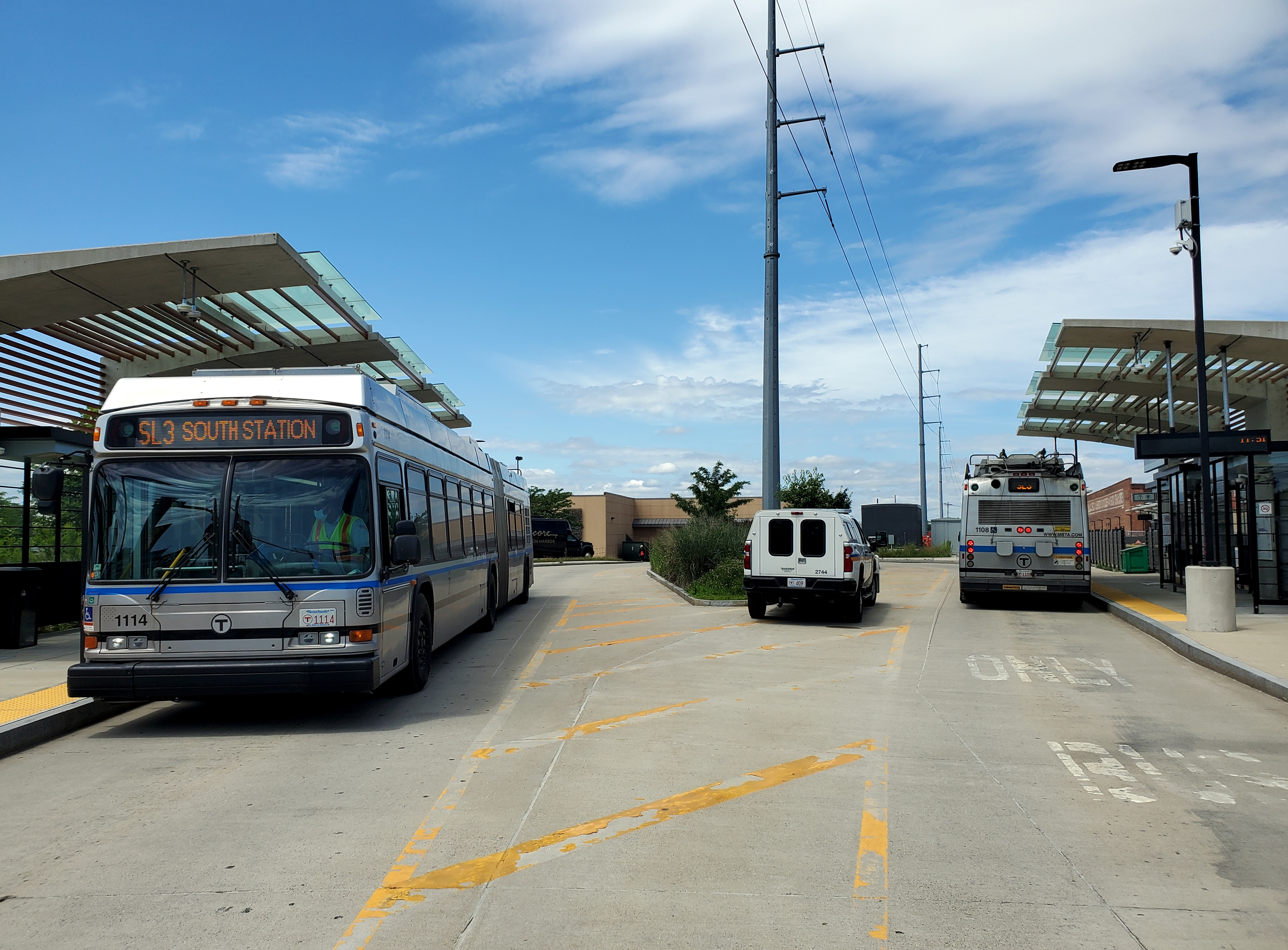
- Silver Line buses at Chelsea station in July 2021

General information
- Location: 174 Everett Avenue at Mystic Mall; Chelsea, Massachusetts
- Coordinates: 42.396762°N 71.040425°W
- Lines: Eastern Route; Silver Line busway
- Platforms: 2 side platforms (Silver Line); 2 side platforms (commuter rail)
- Tracks: 2 (commuter rail)
- Connections: MBTA bus: 112, 114; Lower Mystic Link

Construction
- Parking: No
- Cycle facilities: Covered racks
- Accessible: Yes

Other information
- Fare zone: 1A (commuter rail)

History
- Opened: April 21, 2018 (Silver Line); November 15, 2021 (commuter rail)

Passengers
- 2024: 365 daily boardings (commuter rail)

Services
Preceding station	MBTA	Following station
Terminus	Silver Line SL3	Bellingham Square toward South Station
North Station Terminus	Newburyport/Rockport Line	River Works toward Newburyport or Rockport
Location

Chelsea station is a Massachusetts Bay Transportation Authority (MBTA) intermodal transit station located adjacent to the Mystic Mall in Chelsea, Massachusetts. It is the terminus of the SL3 route of the MBTA Silver Line bus rapid transit (BRT) network, and is served by the Newburyport/Rockport Line of the MBTA Commuter Rail. The accessible station has a loop with two small platforms for the Silver Line, and two full-length side platforms for commuter rail trains.

East Everett station, located near the modern Chelsea station, was served by the Boston and Maine Railroad and predecessor Eastern Railroad from 1880 until around 1950. Prior to its 2010 cancellation, the Urban Ring Project planned for a circumferential BRT line with a stop at Mystic Mall. Planning continued for the Chelsea segment; a Silver Line extension to Mystic Mall with a new commuter rail station was announced in 2013. Construction began in 2015, and SL3 service to Chelsea station began on April 21, 2018. Commuter rail service began in 2021, replacing the previous station to the east.

== Station layout ==
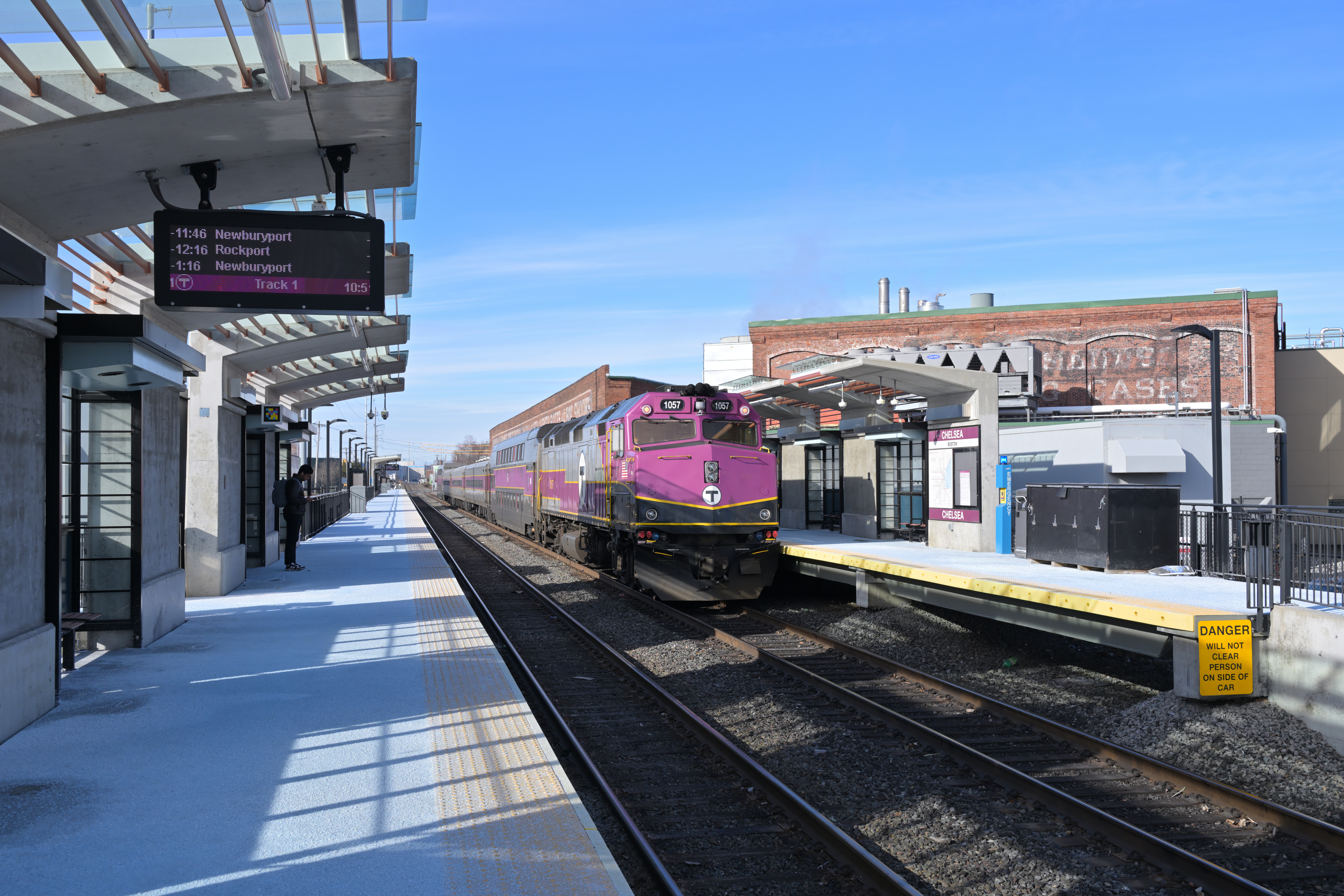
A commuter rail train at the station in 2025

The station is located west of Everett Avenue in the west part of Chelsea, behind the Mystic Mall shopping center. Two 800-foot-long (240 m) high-level side platforms serve the two tracks of the Newburyport/Rockport Line, which runs roughly east–west at the station site. Canopies cover the east ends and portions of the centers of the platforms. Ramps lead to the Everett Avenue grade crossing from the east ends of the platforms, and to the Third Street crossing from the west ends. The Silver Line busway runs along the south side of the commuter rail tracks, crossing Everett Avenue at grade. A balloon loop is located west of Everett Avenue; 12-by-60-foot (3.7 m × 18.3 m) bus platforms with concrete canopies are located on both sides of the loop. The station is accessible on both modes. MBTA bus local routes 112 and 114 stop at Mystic Mall near the station.

== History ==
=== East Everett station ===
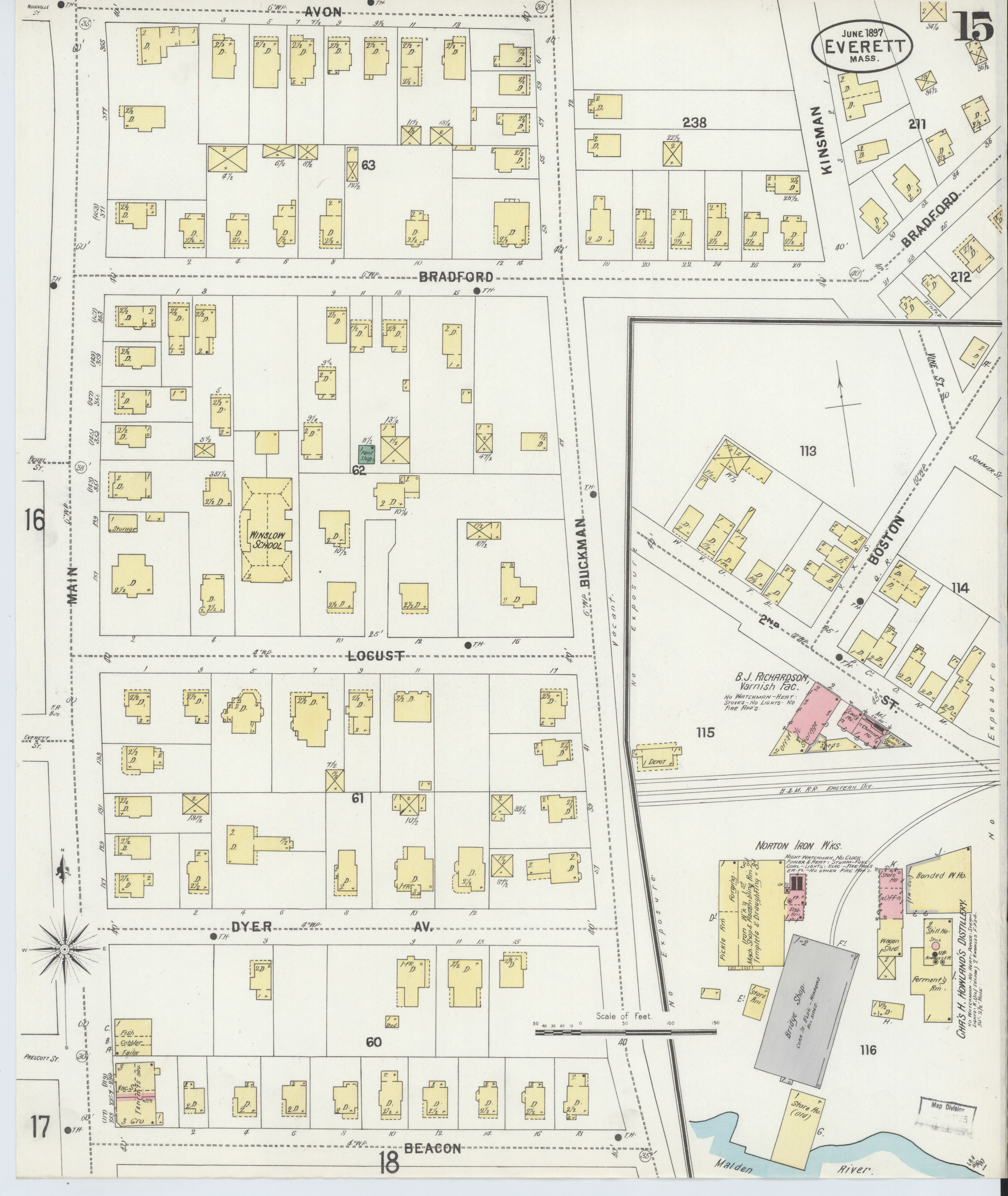
East Everett station (left) on an 1897 Sanborn map

The freight-only Grand Junction Railroad opened through Everett and Chelsea in 1852 to serve the East Boston docks. On April 10, 1854, the Eastern Railroad opened a line from Revere to Boston, with trackage rights over the Grand Junction from Chelsea to Somerville. This replaced the Eastern's 1838-built mainline from Revere to East Boston – which required a ferry connection to reach downtown Boston – as the railroad's primary Boston entry. In 1868, the Eastern built its own tracks on the north side of the Grand Junction tracks.

The Eastern Railroad opened East Everett station in 1880. Located at the end of Boston Street just west of 2nd Street, about 1/3 mile (0.5 km) west of the modern station, it served residential areas to the southeast. The one-story wooden station building was constructed by nearby property owners at a cost of $1,000 (equivalent to $28,000 in 2024). The Eastern Railroad was acquired by the Boston and Maine Railroad (B&M) in 1885.

Streetcars and later automobiles cut heavily into the profitability of local commuter rail service; the B&M closed the station building in 1932, though some trains continued to stop. The building was demolished around 1933. The stop was served by only one weekday-only round trip by 1946, and was abandoned entirely by 1952. The remaining local stops on the line south of Lynn were closed in 1958.

The Massachusetts Bay Transportation Authority (MBTA) began subsidizing remaining B&M service on the line in 1965; it became the Newburyport/Rockport Line of the MBTA Commuter Rail system. On December 27, 1966, an outbound Budd RDC struck an oil tanker truck at the 2nd Street grade crossing, killing 13 people. The residential neighborhood around 2nd Street, already planned for urban renewal, was destroyed by the Great Chelsea fire of 1973; it was replaced by industry and the Mystic Mall. The Grand Junction tracks in Chelsea were largely unused after the Chelsea Creek bridge burned in 1955. In 2002, CSX Transportation began the process of abandoning the Grand Junction from 2nd Street through Chelsea to East Boston; the proceedings were delayed by negotiations with the city of Chelsea to acquire the right-of-way.

=== MBTA station ===
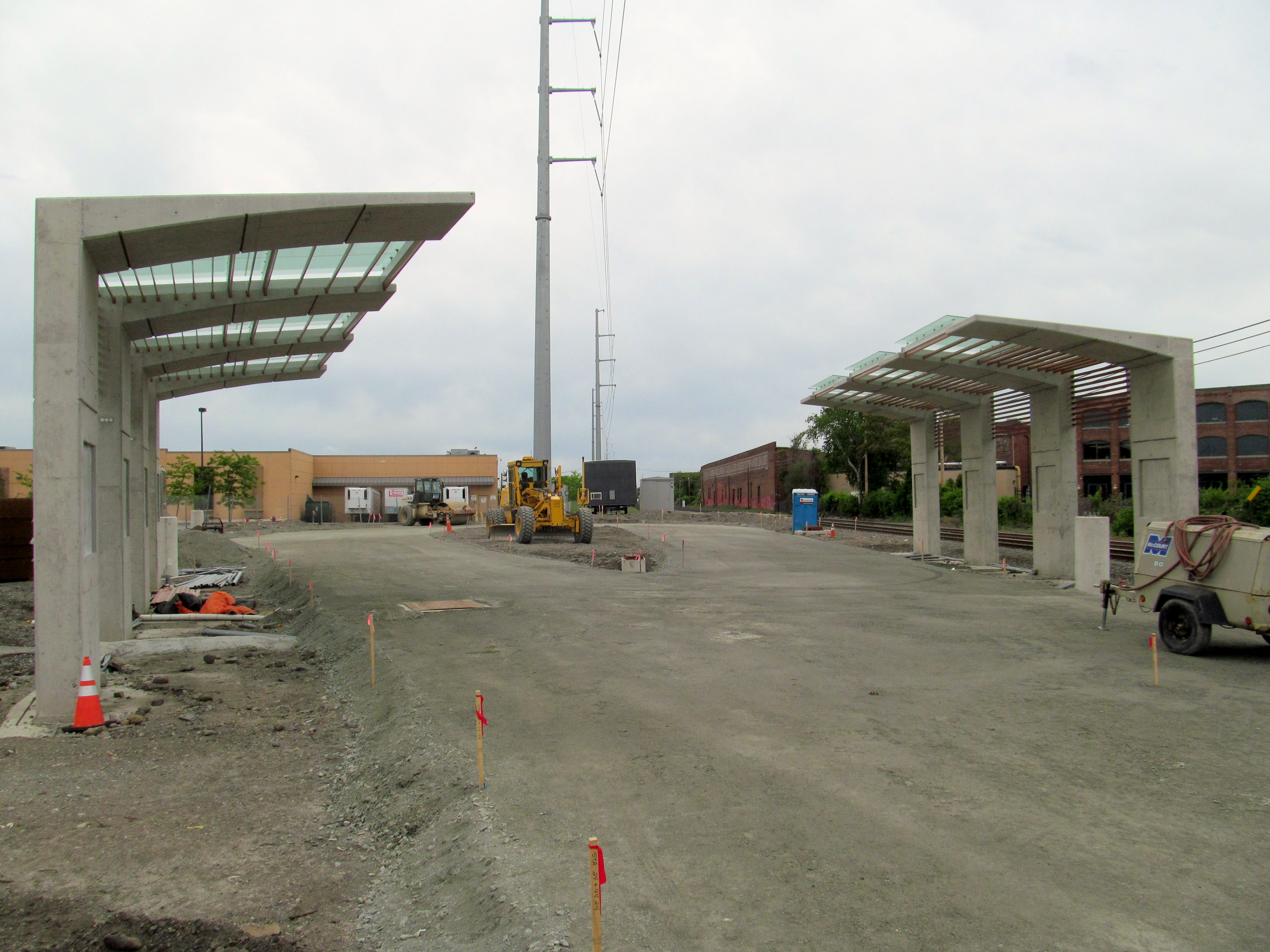
The Silver Line station under construction in 2017

Mystic Mall was a proposed stop on the Urban Ring Project – a planned circumferential bus rapid transit (BRT) line designed to connect the current radial MBTA rail lines. Under draft plans released in 2008, a dedicated busway was to be built using the disused Grand Junction right-of-way, paralleling the active commuter rail tracks through Everett and Chelsea. Buses would have left the busway to access new surface-level BRT platforms on Everett Street and Spruce Street. The Chelsea commuter rail station would have been rebuilt at its existing site. The project was shelved in January 2010 due to high costs. That June, the Massachusetts Department of Transportation (MassDOT) purchased the disused Grand Junction right-of-way from 2nd Street to East Boston, to be land banked for future transportation use. Planning for some smaller corridors continued; the Chelsea–South Boston section was given high priority because Chelsea was densely populated yet underserved by transit. A 2011 state study analyzed potential Chelsea transit improvements, including a Silver Line branch or improvements to the route 112 bus. The Silver Line alternatives terminated at the Chelsea commuter rail station or Bellingham Square and did not serve the Mystic Mall area.

In March 2013, the MBTA began studying a possible extension of the Silver Line to Chelsea via a newly constructed bypass road in East Boston. Three alternatives were discussed for the Chelsea section. One would run up the disused section of the Grand Junction Railroad right-of-way from Eastern Avenue to Chelsea station with stops at Eastern Avenue, Highland/Box District, the existing Chelsea station, and Mystic Mall. The second alignment would follow the Grand Junction to just short of Bellingham Square, then diverge onto surface roads to the square. The third alignment would run largely on surface streets, serving two stops on Central Avenue and four stops along a loop serving the existing Chelsea station and the MGH Chelsea healthcare center near Mystic Mall. In September 2013, the MBTA indicated that it would pursue the first alternative despite potential issues with bridge clearances and rebuilding Chelsea station.

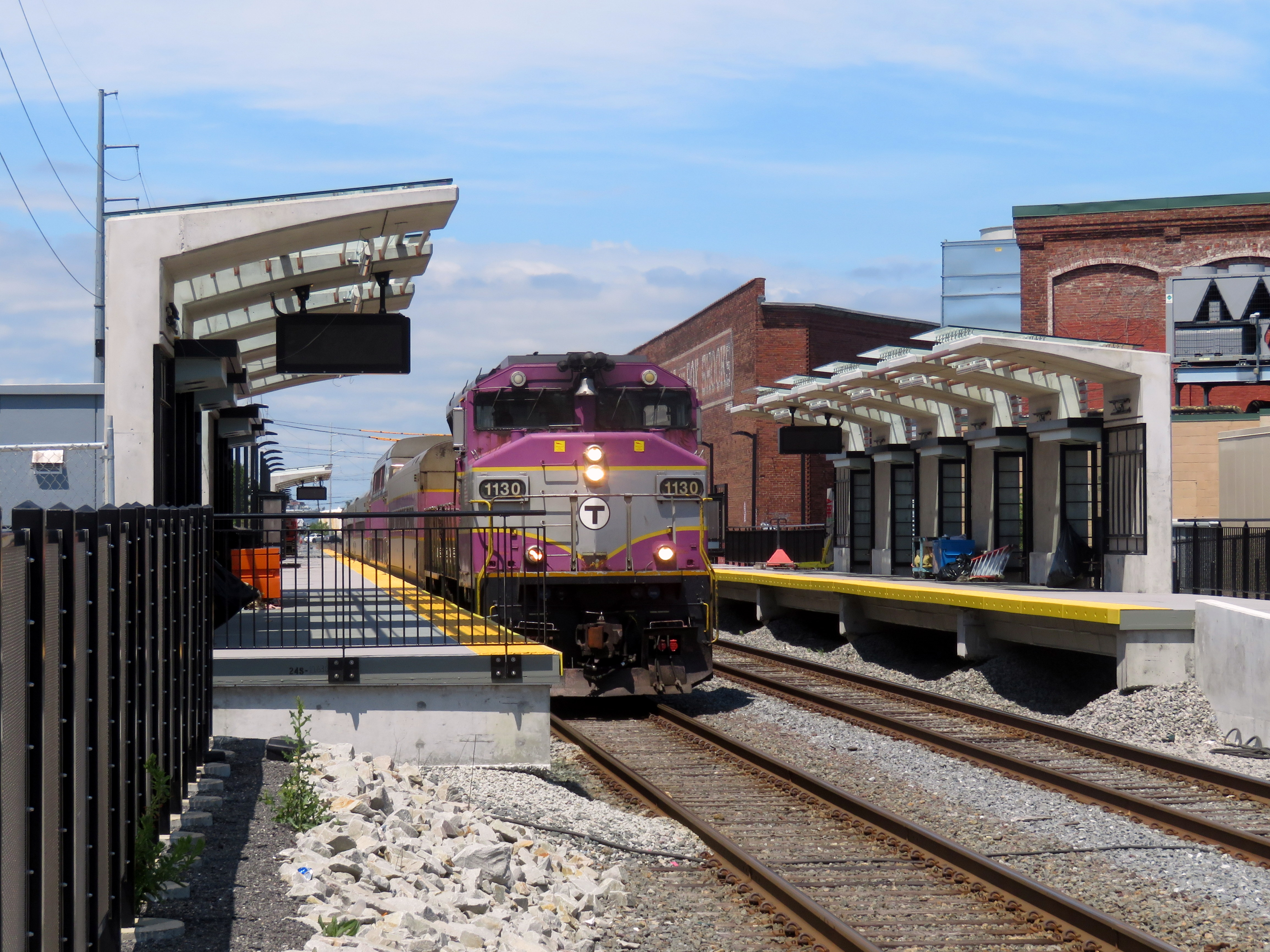
A train passing the nearly-complete platforms in July 2021

On October 30, 2013, MassDOT announced $82.5 million in state funding for construction of a modified version of the first alternative. A new $20 million Chelsea commuter rail station would be constructed at the Mystic Mall busway terminus to replace the existing station. This new station would make the commuter rail station fully accessible, with longer platforms so that trains would not block grade crossings while stopped. The Silver Line would have a new Bellingham Square stop at the old commuter rail station location. Service was expected to begin in late 2015. The Environmental Impact Report was issued in March 2014. A $33.8 million construction contract was approved in September 2014, and construction began in March 2015. By June 2017, opening had been pushed back to April 2018. Silver Line service to Chelsea on the SL3 route began on April 21, 2018.

The MBTA opened bidding for the contract to construct the new commuter rail station (which also includes installation of several nearby traffic signals and demolition of the existing station) in February 2019, with an expected cost of $26.7 million. A $32.4 million contract was awarded in April 2019, with completion then expected in late 2021. Construction of the project (which has a total cost of $37.7 million) began in August 2019. The supports for the outbound platform were completed by April 2020, and the platforms were installed that August. The station reached 70% completion in March 2021. It opened on November 15, 2021, replacing the commuter rail platforms at Bellingham Square (which remains a Silver Line stop). A formal ribbon-cutting ceremony was held on December 15. Service on the inner portion of the Newburyport/Rockport Line was suspended for several periods in March–September 2022 to accommodate signal work on the line. The Encore Boston Harbor casino ran shuttles to Chelsea station from the casino's June 2019 opening until July 2024.
