= Bellingham Square station =

Bus rapid transit station in Chelsea, Massachusetts, US

Bellingham Sq
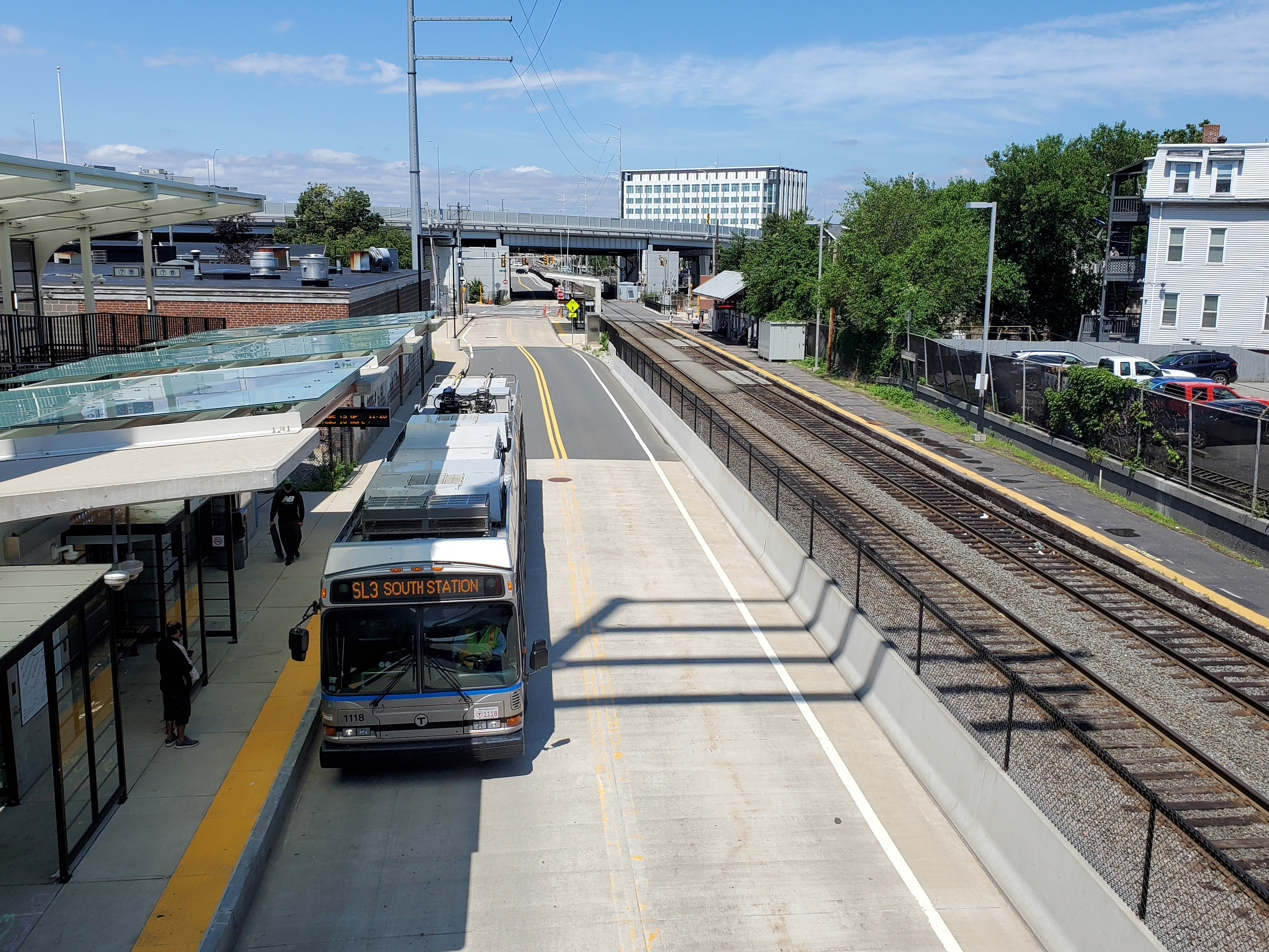
- An inbound bus at Bellingham Square station in 2021

General information
- Location: Arlington Street and 6th Street; Chelsea, Massachusetts
- Coordinates: 42.3957°N 71.0342°W
- Lines: Silver Line busway; Eastern Route
- Platforms: 2 side platforms
- Connections: MBTA bus: 104, 111, 112, 114, 116

Construction
- Parking: No
- Cycle facilities: None
- Accessible: Yes

History
- Opened: November 29, 1985 (commuter rail); April 21, 2018 (Silver Line)
- Closed: November 15, 2021 (commuter rail)

Services
Preceding station	MBTA	Following station
Chelsea Terminus	Silver Line SL3	Box District toward South Station
Former services
Preceding station	MBTA	Following station
North Station Terminus	Newburyport/Rockport Line Relocated to Chelsea	River Works toward Newburyport or Rockport
Location

Bellingham Square station (formerly Chelsea station) is a Massachusetts Bay Transportation Authority (MBTA) Silver Line bus rapid transit (BRT) station located near Bellingham Square slightly north of downtown Chelsea, Massachusetts. The station has two accessible side platforms for buses on the SL3 route. The Boston and Maine Railroad and predecessor Eastern Railroad served Chelsea station at the same location from the mid-1850s to 1958. The MBTA opened Chelsea station on the Newburyport/Rockport Line in 1985. Prior to its 2010 cancellation, the Urban Ring Project planned for a circumferential BRT line with a stop at Mystic Mall. Planning continued for the Chelsea segment; a Silver Line extension to Mystic Mall was announced in 2013. Construction began in 2015, and SL3 service to the renamed Bellingham Square station began on April 21, 2018. Commuter rail service moved to the newly constructed Chelsea station on November 15, 2021.

== Station layout ==
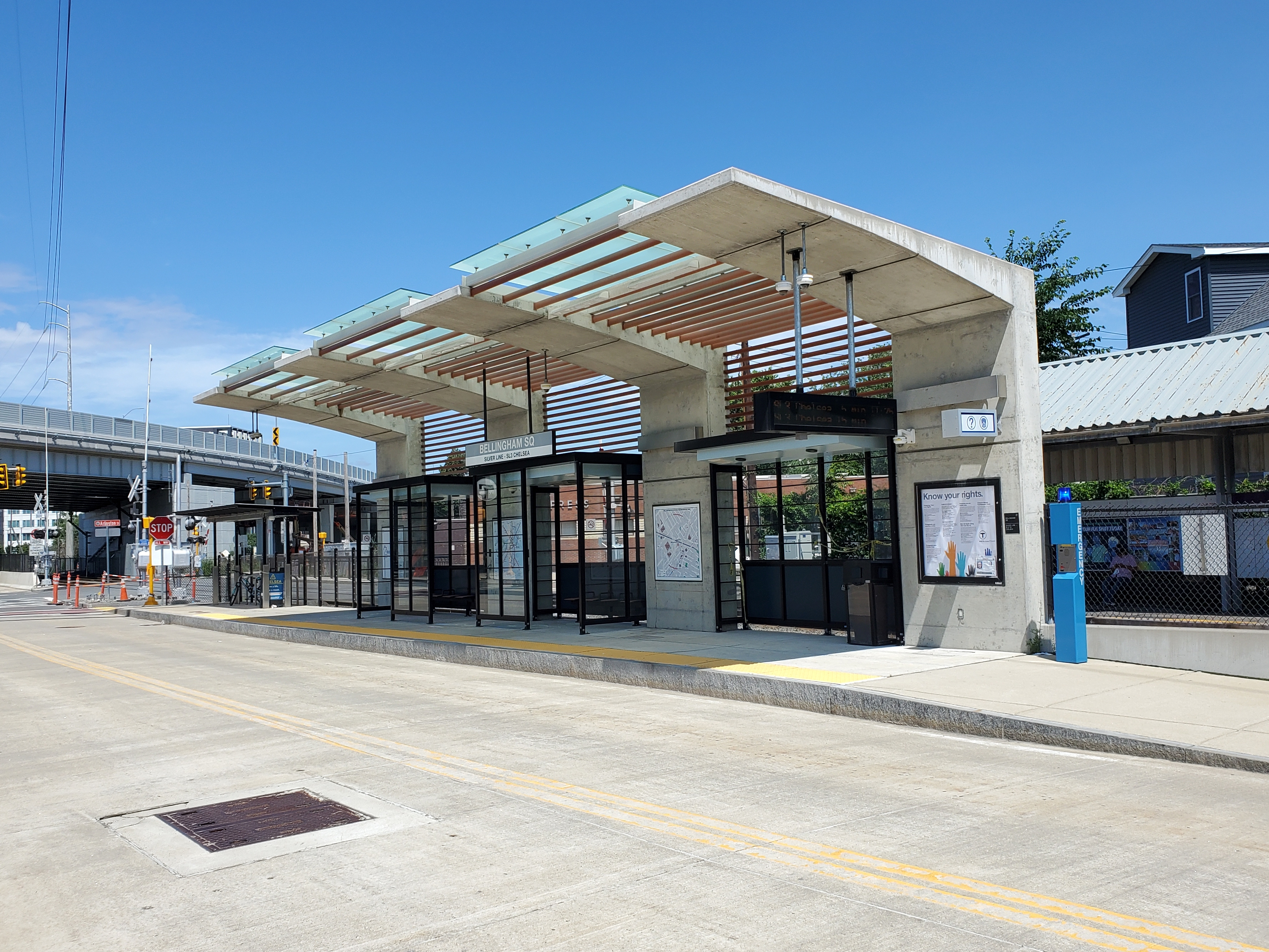
The outbound Silver Line platform

The station is located between Sixth Street and Washington Avenue, about 800 feet (240 m) north of Bellingham Square. The Newburyport/Rockport Line and the adjacent Silver Line busway run roughly east-west at the station site, with the busway on the south side. The 12-by-60-foot (3.7 m × 18.3 m) outbound (westbound) bus platform is located adjacent to the Sixth Street/Arlington Street grade crossing; the inbound platform is located to the east, with a ramp structure leading to the Washington Avenue bridge. Both bus platforms have concrete canopies. Prior to its closure, the remaining commuter rail platform was located on the north side of the two tracks, with a metal shelter. The station is accessible for Silver Line buses.

Five MBTA bus routes converge on Bellingham Square near the station. Routes 104, 112, and 114 serve the station directly on 6th Street. Route 111 serves the station on Washington Avenue, while 116 runs on Broadway to the east.

== History ==
=== Original station ===
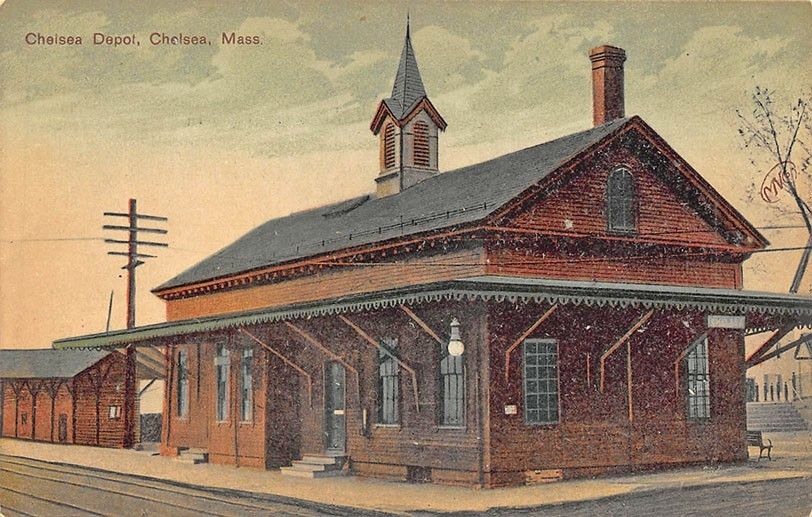
Chelsea station on an early postcard

The freight-only Grand Junction Railroad opened through Everett and Chelsea in 1852 to serve the East Boston docks. On April 10, 1854, the Eastern Railroad opened a line from Revere to Boston, with trackage rights over the Grand Junction from Chelsea to Somerville. This replaced the Eastern's 1838-built mainline from Revere to East Boston – which required a ferry connection to reach downtown Boston – as the railroad's primary Boston entry. A station at Chelsea opened with or soon after the new line.

In 1868, the Eastern built its own tracks on the north side of the Grand Junction tracks. The Eastern Railroad was acquired by the Boston and Maine Railroad (B&M) in 1885. The station building was originally on the south side of the tracks between Washington Avenue and Sixth Street; it was moved across the tracks and closer to Washington Avenue by the 1890s. It was a two-story wooden structure with a small cupola, with a canopy on all sides. The station was moved slightly north to face Heard Street in the 20th century.

On April 18, 1958, the B&M received permission from the Public Utilities Commission to drastically curtail its suburban commuter service, including abandoning branches, closing stations, and cutting trains. Among the approved cuts was the closure of all Eastern Division service south of Lynn, including the entirety of the Saugus Branch, plus mainline stations at East Somerville, Everett, Chelsea, and Forbes. These areas were largely within the Metropolitan Transit Authority bus service area, acquired from the Eastern Massachusetts Street Railway in 1936. The Saugus Branch and mainline stations were closed on May 16, 1958.

=== MBTA Commuter Rail station ===
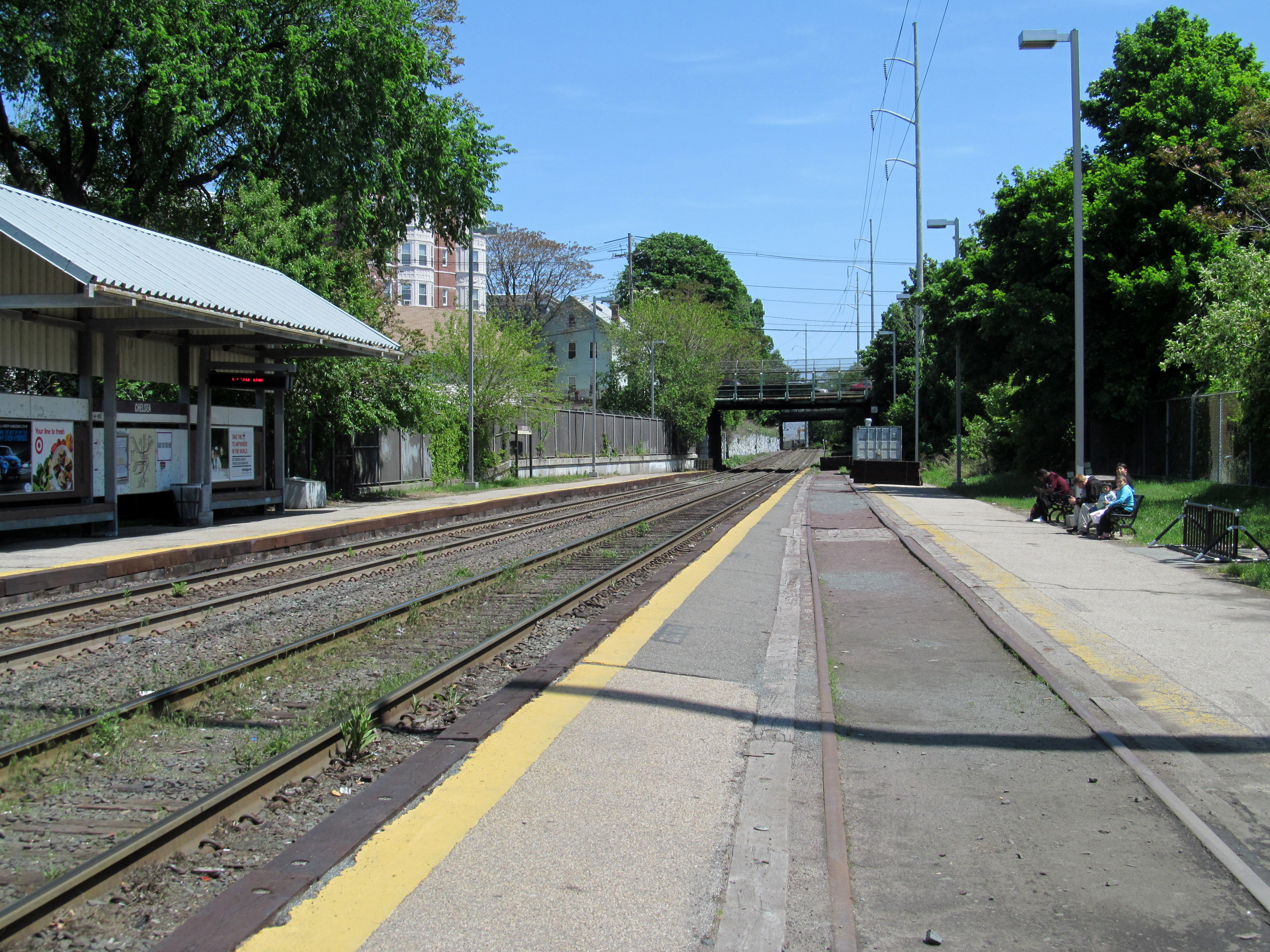
The platforms at Chelsea station in 2012

The Massachusetts Bay Transportation Authority (MBTA) began subsidizing remaining B&M service on the line in 1965; it became the Newburyport/Rockport Line of the MBTA Commuter Rail system. During the late 1960s and early 1970s, the MBTA reopened several inner-suburb commuter rail stations in response to community desire for service that was faster if less frequent than buses. In 1976, Chelsea station was considered for reactivation, but ridership was expected to be relatively small due to the nearby 111 and 112 buses.

On September 4, 1985, the MBTA Board awarded a $412,000 contract to construct a new station at Chelsea. The station opened on December 1, 1985, concurrent with the restoration of regular service on the line following the 1984 fire that destroyed the Danvers River drawbridge. The station was built onto the existing right-of-way at the former station site, with the outbound platform paved over the disused Grand Junction track. It was one of the last non-accessible stations opened by the MBTA. The MBTA was unable to secure an easement from Conrail to construct accessible platforms; the MBTA's failure to make the station accessible resulted in fines from the Massachusetts Architectural Access Board in 1989.

The Grand Junction tracks in Chelsea were largely unused after the Chelsea Creek bridge burned in 1955. In 2002, CSX Transportation began the process of abandoning the Grand Junction from 2nd Street through Chelsea to East Boston; the proceedings were delayed by negotiations with the city of Chelsea to acquire the right-of-way.

=== Silver Line ===
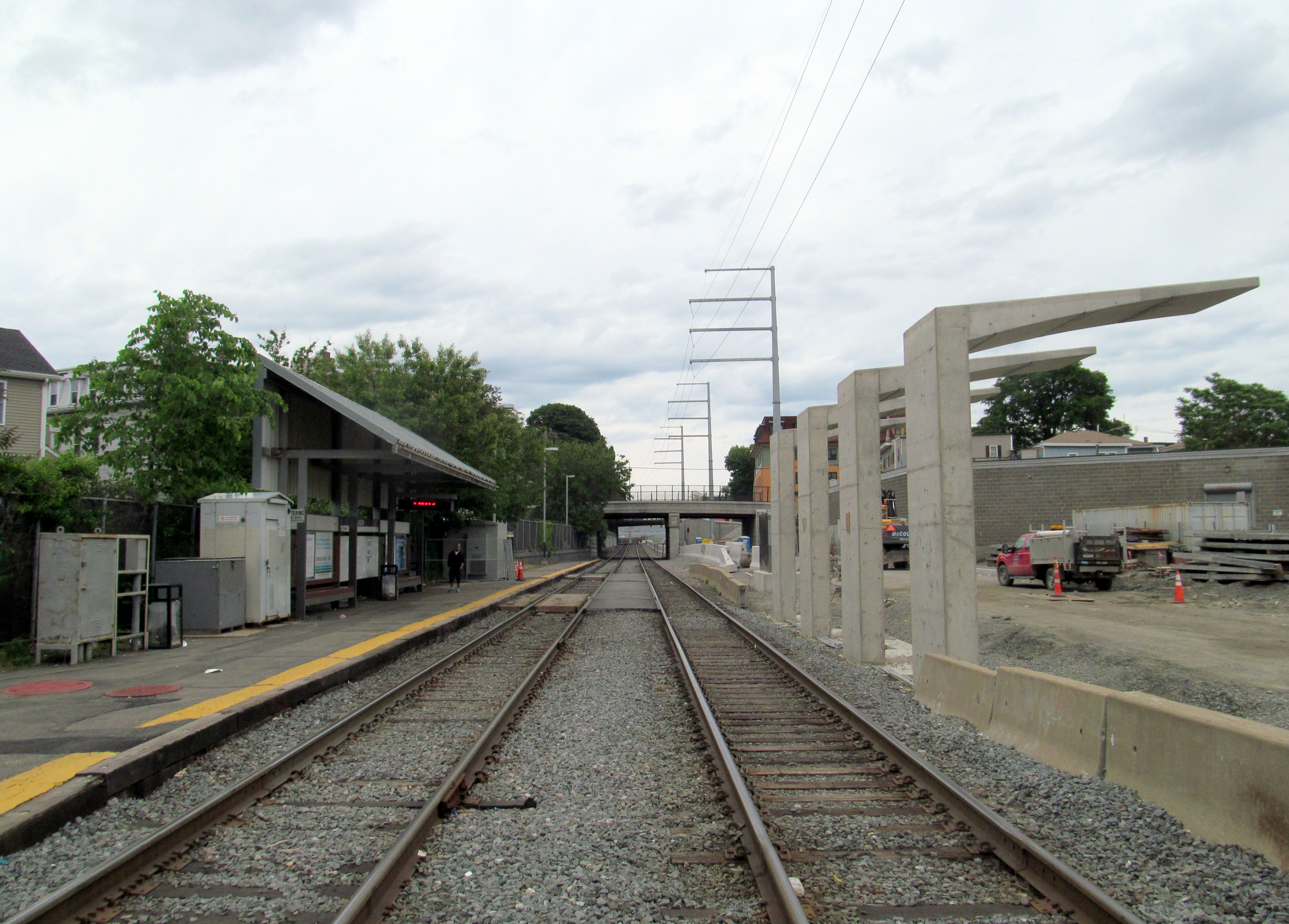
Bellingham Square station under construction in June 2017

Chelsea was a proposed stop on the Urban Ring Project – a planned circumferential bus rapid transit (BRT) line designed to connect the current radial MBTA rail lines. Under draft plans released in 2008, a dedicated busway was to be built using the disused Grand Junction right-of-way, paralleling the active commuter rail tracks through Everett and Chelsea. The commuter rail platforms at Chelsea would have been extended to full length and raised for accessibility, with a new bus station built on the south side of the station. The project was shelved in January 2010 due to high costs.

That June, the Massachusetts Department of Transportation (MassDOT) purchased the disused Grand Junction right-of-way from 2nd Street to East Boston, to be landbanked for future transportation use. Planning for some smaller corridors continued; the Chelsea–South Boston section was given high priority because Chelsea was densely populated yet underserved by transit. A 2011 state study analyzed potential Chelsea transit improvements, including a Silver Line branch or improvements to the route 112 bus. One Silver Line alternative terminated at the Chelsea commuter rail station; the other ran on surface streets with a terminal in Bellingham Square.

In March 2013, the MBTA began studying an extension of the Silver Line to Chelsea via a newly constructed bypass road in East Boston. Three alternatives were discussed for the Chelsea section. One would run up the disused section of the Grand Junction Railroad right-of-way from Eastern Avenue to Chelsea station with stops at Eastern Avenue, Highland/Box District, the existing Chelsea station, and Mystic Mall. The second alignment would follow the Grand Junction to just short of the existing station, then diverge onto surface roads to the square. The third alignment would run largely on surface streets, serving two stops on Central Avenue and four stops along a loop serving the existing station and the MGH Chelsea healthcare center near Mystic Mall. In September 2013, the MBTA indicated that it would pursue the first alternative despite potential issues with bridge clearances and rebuilding Chelsea station.

On October 30, 2013, MassDOT announced $82.5 million in state funding for a modified version of the first alternative to be constructed. The commuter rail station would be moved to the new Chelsea station (at Mystic Mall), where more room was available for platforms, with only the Silver Line stopping at the existing site near Bellingham Square. Service was then expected to begin in late 2015. The Environmental Impact Report was issued in March 2014. A $33.8 million construction contract was approved in September 2014, and construction began in March 2015. The southern (outbound) commuter rail platform was removed to make room for the busway. By June 2017, opening had been pushed back to April 2018. Silver Line service to Chelsea on the SL3 route began on April 21, 2018. Construction on the second phase of the project, which included the relocated Chelsea commuter rail station plus transit signal priority upgrades for the SL3, began in August 2019. The new commuter rail platforms at Chelsea station opened on November 15, 2021, leaving Bellingham Square station served only by the Silver Line. The remaining commuter rail platform at Bellingham Square was removed later in 2021.
