= Chelsea Greenway =

Rail trail in Massachusetts, United States

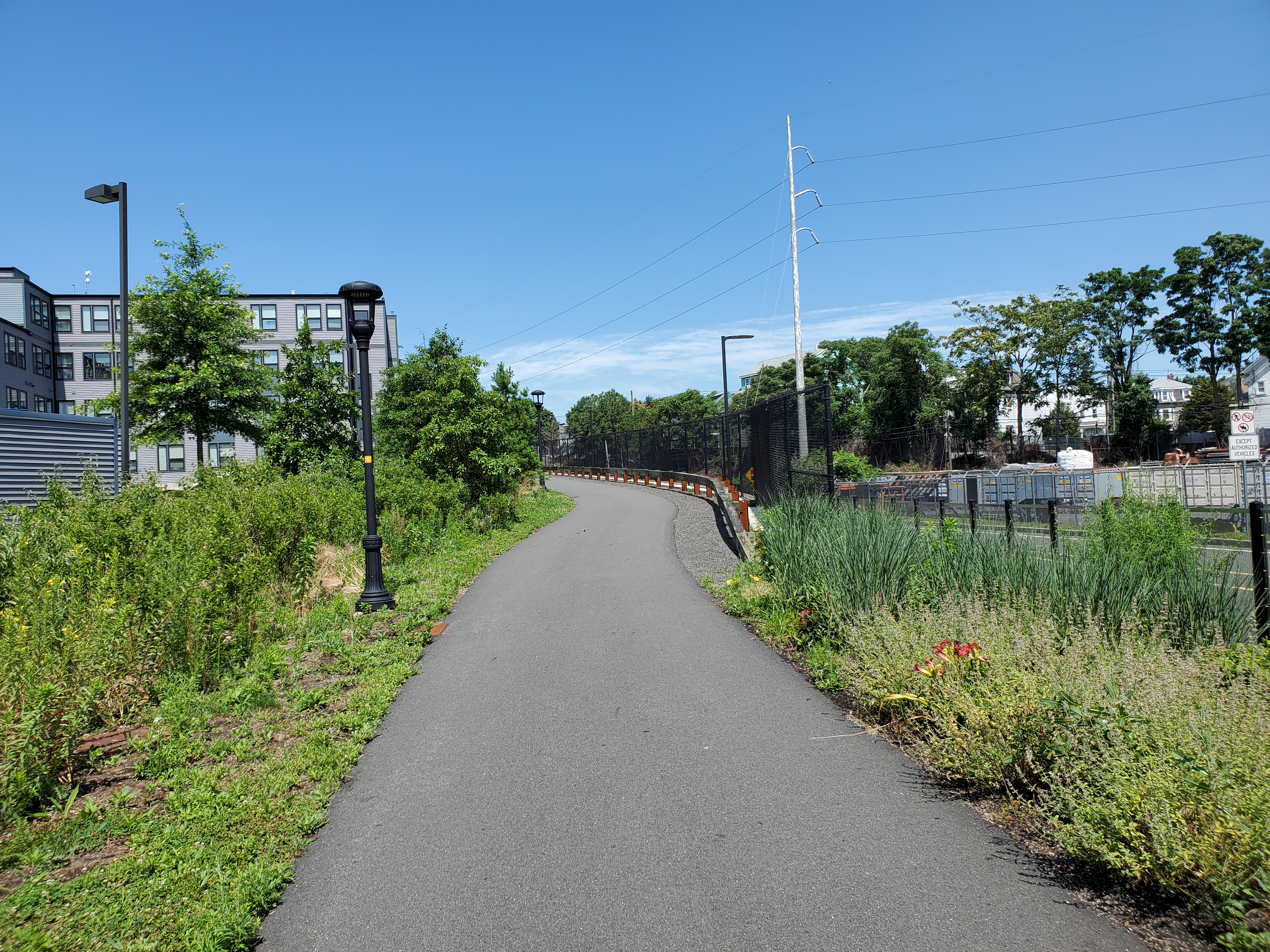
- Chelsea Greenway near Box District station
- Length: 0.7 mi (1.1 km)
- Location: Chelsea, Massachusetts
- Completed: 2018

The Chelsea Greenway is a rail trail in Chelsea, Massachusetts. The 0.7-mile (1.1 km) linear park runs parallel to a Silver Line bus rapid transit busway that follows the former Grand Junction Branch right-of-way. Located within the Box District neighborhood, the path connects Bellingham Square station and Eastern Avenue station.

== History ==
In October 2013, after several months of planning, MassDOT announced that it had secured $3 million in funding for the trail as part of the Silver Line Gateway Extension project, then expected to be completed in 2015. The Greenway opened in 2018 along with the busway, while $1.1 million in landscaping and planting of native species took place in 2019.
