= Mid-City Transitway =

Proposed transit project in the Chicago suburbs

The Mid-City Transitway is a concept for the use of the right-of-way formerly proposed for the Crosstown Expressway in Chicago, Illinois. The uses being studied include a bus-only rapid-transit road (similar to a two-lane road running from McCormick Place north to the Loop), a truck-only bypass around the city center, or a rail rapid transit system (the favored and most feasible of the three primary concepts).

Feasibility studies began in late 2002 and were commissioned by Richard M. Daley, then mayor of Chicago.

Current studies into the Mid-City Transitway utilize a dormant Beltway Railroad railway embankment just east of Cicero Avenue (Illinois Route 50) and other abandoned rail rights-of-way. The feasibility studies will help determine whether a two or four-lane highway can be built atop the embankment. The study corridor is 22 miles (35.4 km) in length. As of December 2009, although feasibility studies have largely been completed, according to published reports, recent economic difficulties in city and state finances have made the initiation of construction on the project increasingly unlikely to proceed within the next seven to ten years.

== Proposed junctions ==
=== Rapid transit line ===
- Montrose
- Irving Park/Milwaukee
- Addison
- Belmont
- Diversey
- Fullerton
- Armitage
- North
- Division
- Chicago
- Lake----Transfer To CTA Green Line
- Congress----Transfer To CTA Blue Line
- Roosevelt
- Cermak----Transfer To CTA Pink Line
- 35th/Hawthorne
- 47th
- Archer
- Midway
- 67th
- Ford City
- 79th
- 83rd
- Cicero
- Pulaski/Southwest
- Kedzie
- Western
- Racine
- Halsted
- Shields
- 87th

== See also ==
- Urban Ring Project (MBTA) in Boston, MA
