= Crosstown Expressway (Chicago) =

Proposed highway in Illinois

Interstate 494
- Crosstown Expressway
- Proposed Crosstown Expressway corridor highlighted in red

Route information
- Maintained by IDOT
- Existed: 1960s–1970s

Major junctions
- South end: Near the intersection of 87th Street and the Dan Ryan Expressway
- North end: Near the Edens/Kennedy junction

Location
- Country: United States
- State: Illinois
- Counties: Cook

Highway system
- Interstate Highway System; Main; Auxiliary; Suffixed; Business; Future; Illinois State Highway System; Interstate; US; State; Tollways; Scenic

The Crosstown Expressway, suggested as Interstate 494 (I-494), was a proposed highway route in Chicago, Illinois. It was originally planned through the 1960s and 1970s.

== Route description ==
The highway was to begin from a connection with the Kennedy Expressway and Edens Expressway (I-90 and I-94) near Montrose Avenue on the city's Northwest Side. It was to follow an alignment parallel and adjacent to the Belt Railway of Chicago, approximately one-half mile (0.8 km) east of Cicero Avenue, and extend southerly over railroad right-of-way through the West Side of Chicago and across the Sanitary and Ship Canal, to a connection with the Stevenson Expressway (I-55).

South of this confluence, the route would continue south in a reverse-direction, split arrangement with the northbound highway lanes depressed along Cicero Avenue and the southbound lanes depressed along the Belt Railway of Chicago tracks. Continuing south past the proposed traffic interchange at Chicago Midway International Airport, the expressway alignment was to turn southeasterly at 67th Street and continue over Belt Railway right-of-way to Lawndale Avenue then turn easterly towards the Dan Ryan Expressway along Norfolk Southern Railway right-of-way (now Metra-South West Service) and 75th Street to an interchange with the Dan Ryan Expressway (I-94) north of 91st Street.

Extra lanes were planned to extend north from the proposed Dan Ryan/Crosstown interchange to connect with the Chicago Skyway (I-90) near 66th and State Streets.

The I-494 number was originally to be used for a freeway upgrade of Lake Shore Drive; when that upgrade was cancelled in 1966, the I-494 designation was moved to the Crosstown Expressway.

== History ==
The origins of the Crosstown Expressway can be found in Burnham and Bennett's 1909 Plan of Chicago, which proposed a grand circumferential road to divert traffic around central Chicago. The route was incorporated in the Chicago Plan Commission's plans for post-war highway construction. The Federal-Aid Highway Act of 1956 spurred extensive construction around Chicago, but by 1960, the Crosstown Expressway was the only route included in the region's postwar transportation plans yet to break ground. The State of Illinois, Cook County, and City of Chicago formed the Crosstown Expressway Task Force in 1963. According to then Chicago Commissioner for Public Works, Milton Pikarsky, the task force aimed "to demonstrate the feasibility of the proposed expressway... in sufficient detail so that the need for an expressway could not be challenged". Public resentment over the experience of highway construction in the late 1950s and early 1960s, however, prompted a comprehensive re-evaluation of the Crosstown route.

=== Cancellation ===
On February 25, 1967, the federal government proposed the Crosstown Expressway be redesigned as a "total development concept" that would integrate mass transit, high-rise apartment buildings, commercial and industrial zones, and green space. Mayor Richard J. Daley stated the road would be "the most modern and beautiful expressway in the nation". By 1972, the Crosstown Expressway had emerged as the national testing ground for a new kind of urban expressway centered upon neighborhood integration rather than regional development. Some community groups strongly opposed these plans; notably the Citizens Action Program (CAP) and the Anti-Crosstown Action Committee, who turned the proposed expressway into a pivotal issue in the 1972 local, state, and federal elections. Dan Walker, an independent Democrat, defeated incumbent Governor Richard Ogilvie 51% to 49% on a strong anti-Crosstown platform. Walker appeared at the 1973 CAP annual convention to declare the Crosstown Expressway will not be built.

Political wrangling, however, over the Crosstown Expressway continued between Walker and Daley until the latter's death in December 1976. Changing public opinion across the country on urban highway construction, the mid-1970s energy crisis, and rapidly escalating costs (from the total development concept additions and runaway inflation rates) ultimately undermined the expressway. Restructured proposals for the southern leg of the Crosstown route were agreed by Mayor Michael Bilandic and Governor James R. Thompson in March 1977. However, in January 1979, the Crosstown Expressway project was finally cancelled by Mayor Jane M. Byrne and Governor Thompson. In the $1.916 billion in federal funds earmarked for the Crosstown Expressway and (never-built) Franklin Line Subway were then reallocated to Chicago's regional transit agencies, and to other road improvements across northeastern Illinois. These funds would also support the extension of the Blue Line L train to O'Hare International Airport and the construction of the Orange Line L train to Midway Airport.

=== Revival attempts ===
In 2001, Mayor Richard M. Daley announced plans for a Mid-City Transitway, using the alignment of the Chicago Belt Line Railway that the Crosstown Expressway route was to have followed. The Mid-City project was placed in the Chicago Area Transportation Study's Destination 2020: Regional Transportation Plan and still awaits study and approval. Proposals for a Circle Line providing circumferential transit options closer to the Loop have been prioritized over investment in the Transitway project by city officials and the Chicago Metropolitan Agency for Planning (CMAP).

On February 21, 2007, Illinois House of Representatives Speaker Michael Madigan proposed legislation that would make a future Crosstown Expressway a part of the Illinois State Toll Highway Authority (ISTHA). However, the proposal was not previously looked at by the office of the mayor, governor, ISTHA or the Illinois Department of Transportation.

== See also ==
- Transportation in Chicago
