= Urban Ring Project =

Circumferential rail transit route in Massachusetts

MBTA Urban Ring
- Parent: Massachusetts Bay Transportation Authority
- Founded: Suspended, but partial implementation of some segments is proceeding
- Headquarters: 10 Park Plaza, Boston, MA 02116
- Locale: Boston, Massachusetts
- Service area: Boston, Chelsea, Everett, Medford, Somerville, Cambridge, and Brookline
- Service type: Bus rapid transit
- Routes: 1 circumferential, with 2 major spurs
- Stations: 31 proposed
- Daily ridership: 282,000–293,000 passengers per day in 2025 (estimated)
- Fuel type: Diesel
- Operator: MBTA
- Website: www.massdot.state.ma.us/theurbanring/

The Urban Ring was a proposed project of the Massachusetts Bay Transportation Authority and the Massachusetts Department of Transportation, to develop new public transportation routes that would provide improved circumferential connections among many existing transit lines that project radially from downtown Boston. The Urban Ring Corridor is located roughly one to two miles from downtown Boston, passing through the Massachusetts cities of Boston, Chelsea, Everett, Medford, Somerville, Cambridge, and Brookline. The project was expected to convert 41,500 car trips to transit trips daily.

The Major Investment Study split the project into three phases, the first of which (enhanced bus service) was partially implemented. The planning of Phase 2 was suspended in January 2010 because MBTA and the Commonwealth of Massachusetts have insufficient funding to build a substantial portion of that phase (projected to cost $2.4 billion). As of 2019, some interim bus service improvements have been implemented or are underway, in the absence of major funding.

== Background ==
Transportation advocates in Boston have complained that rail transit riders cannot travel from one outlying area to another without first traveling to the downtown hub stations, changing lines, and traveling outbound again. Some of the radial transit lines, notably the Green Line, are so overcrowded that service is very slow and limited in capacity because of rush-hour "crush loads". There are several crosstown MBTA bus routes, but they are slow, unreliable, and subject to bus bunching because they must operate in mixed street traffic.

A circumferential rapid transit line was proposed by the City of Boston in 1923 and listed as a possibility for a "remote date" in a 1926 regional study. It was not again seriously considered until the 1972 Boston Transportation Planning Review. Detailed proposals were not studied until the late 1990s.

== Project proposal ==
The proposed project has three phases. The first phase has been partially implemented. Phase 1, as it is commonly called, involves expanding "crosstown" bus lines serving the entire corridor and "express commuter" lines connecting to suburban locations. Phase 2 would create six overlapping bus rapid transit lines forming a complete ring around downtown Boston. Phase 3 includes the implementation of rail service on the most heavily traveled portion of the ring, from Assembly Square in Somerville to Nubian Square in the Roxbury neighborhood of Boston, via East Cambridge.

== Phase 1 ==
Phase 1, as recommended in the 2001 Major Investment Study, was to add interim service within 5 years while planning and construction took place for further phases. The three existing crosstown (CT) bus routes would have been modified, and eight additional crosstown routes added. Two express commuter (EC) routes would also have been added to provide radial service to portions of the corridor. (A third route, EC3, was dropped from consideration due to low projected ridership.) Phase 1 was to cost $98.5 million, primarily for acquisition of 100 new buses and expansion of bus garages. Because of the limited construction scope, it did not require further environmental review.

Route	Terminals		Via
CT4	Ruggles	JFK/UMass	Dudley Square and Uphams Corner
CT5	Logan Airport terminals	Sullivan Square	Chelsea and Everett
CT6	Bellingham Square	Kendall/MIT	Community College and Lechmere
CT7	Kendall/MIT	Franklin Park Zoo	Kenmore, Ruggles, and Dudley Square
CT8	Sullivan Square	Longwood Medical Area	Union Square, University Park, Lower Cambridgeport, and Boston University
CT9	Kenmore	Harvard	Boston University and Allston Landing
CT10	Kenmore	JFK/UMass	Longwood Medical Area, MFA, Ruggles, Washington St/Silver Line, City Hospital, BU Medical Area, Newmarket/South Bay, Andrew
CT11	Longwood Medical Area	Fields Corner station	MFA, BU Medical, and Uphams Corner
EC1	Anderson/Woburn	University Park	Sullivan Square and Lechmere
EC2	Riverside	Lechmere	Newton Corner, Allston Landing, Central Square, and Kendall Square
EC3	Route 9 Natick	Kenmore	Wellesley Hills, Riverside, Newton Corner, and Longwood Medical Area

== Phase 2 ==
=== Draft EIR ===
Map of the proposed Phase 2 system

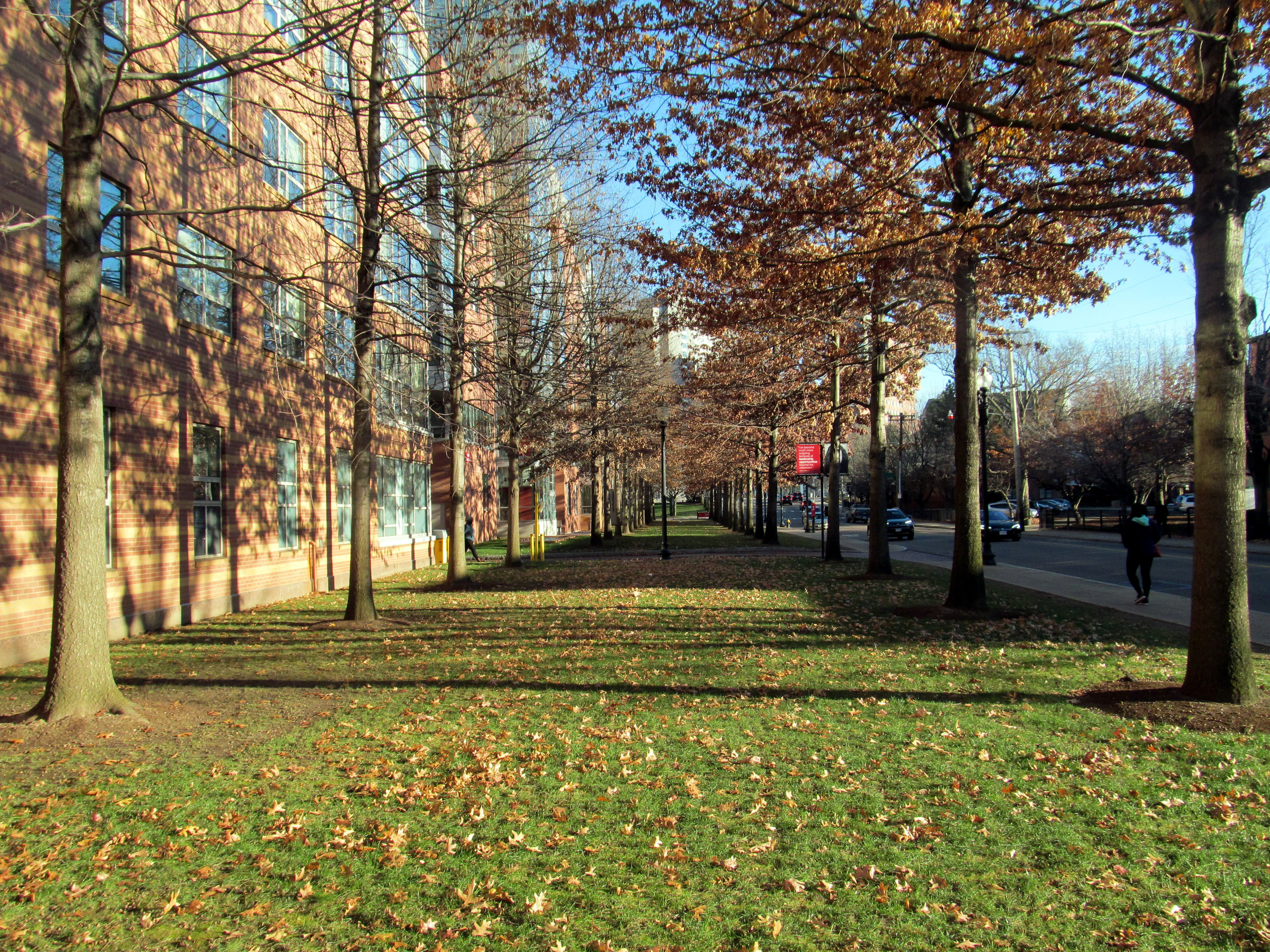
MBTA-owned right of way along Ruggles Street, which would have been used for the Urban Ring busway

The MBTA filed the Draft Environmental Impact Report (DEIR) for Phase 2 with the Massachusetts Environmental Policy Act (MEPA) Office on November 30, 2004. In its FY2005-10 and draft FY2006-11 Capital Improvement Plans, the MBTA has not budgeted any money for the Urban Ring project, beyond supporting the EIR process.

Phase 2 would convert and expand five of the "crosstown" lines (CT2, CT3, CT4, CT5, and CT8) into bus rapid transit lines that overlap and form a complete ring around the urban core.

- BRT 1: Airport Station to Kendall Square via Wellington, Assembly Square, Sullivan Square, and Lechmere
- BRT 2: Logan Airport Terminals to Wellington with local service to Chelsea and Everett
- BRT 3: Wellington to Kendall via Gilman Square, Union Square Somerville, and Lechmere
- BRT 5: Lechmere to Ruggles via Kendall, Grand Junction/MIT, BU Bridge, Kenmore/Yawkey/Fenway, and Huntington Avenue
- BRT 6: Commonwealth Ave at Boston University Central to UMass Boston via Ruggles, Melnea Cass Blvd, Uphams Corner
- BRT 7: Longwood Medical Area to Mystic Mall via South Boston, World Trade Center, Ted Williams Tunnel, and Downtown Chelsea

BRT connections with the commuter rail lines would be improved by expanding the following existing stations:

- Downtown Chelsea (Newburyport/Rockport Line)
- Yawkey (Framingham/Worcester Line, project initiated, construction scheduled for completion in 2014)
- Ruggles (inbound platform for Northeast corridor)

The following new Commuter Rail stations would be created:

- Sullivan Square (near junction of Newburyport/Rockport and Haverhill/Reading Lines)
- Gilman Square (Lowell Line)
- Union Square (Fitchburg Line)

The new BRT lines would make additional connections at other commuter rail stops, rapid transit stops, and bus hubs.

Some parts of the BRT system would run in mixed traffic, including through the Ted Williams Tunnel and to the terminals at Logan International Airport. Dedicated lanes would be provided for certain portions, including:

- The Grand Junction Railroad right-of-way, which runs through the campus of the Massachusetts Institute of Technology and crosses the Charles River under the Boston University Bridge
- Railroad right-of-way in Somerville, connecting with Lechmere
- Portions from East Boston to Chelsea
- Melnea Cass Boulevard, connecting the Silver, Orange, and Green Lines (E Branch)
- The Haul Road in South Boston

Ridership was estimated at 106,000 passengers per day in 2010; capital cost was estimated at $500 million.

=== 2008 revised draft EIR ===
The revised route of the ring had the following stops:

Station	BRT routes	Existing connections	City / Neighborhood
Logan International Airport	2	Silver Line	Boston / East Boston
Airport	1, 2, 7	Blue Line	Boston / East Boston
Griffin Way	1, 2, 7		Chelsea
Downtown Chelsea	1, 2, 7	Newburyport/Rockport Line	Chelsea
Mystic Mall	1, 7		Chelsea
Everett	1, 2		Everett
Wellington	1, 2	Orange Line	Medford
Assembly Square	1, 2		Somerville / Assembly Square
Sullivan Square	1, 2, 5	Orange Line	Boston / Charlestown
Inner Belt Road	1, 5		Somerville / Inner Belt
Lechmere	1, 5	Green Line	Cambridge / East Cambridge
First Street	1, 5		Cambridge / East Cambridge
Binney Street	1, 5		Cambridge / East Cambridge
Broadway	1		Cambridge / Tech Square
Kendall/MIT	1, 5	Red Line	Cambridge / Kendall Square
Massachusetts Ave / MIT	5		Cambridge / MIT campus
Cambridgeport	5		Cambridge / Cambridgeport
BU Bridge	5, 6	Green Line – B branch (at Boston University Central)	Boston / Boston University campus
Yawkey	5, 6, 7	Framingham/Worcester Line	Boston / Fenway–Kenmore
Fenway	5, 6, 7	Green Line – D branch	Boston / Fenway-Kenmore
LMA	5, 6, 7		Boston (Longwood Medical Area)
Ruggles	5, 6, 7	Orange Line Providence/Stoughton Line Needham Line Franklin/Foxboro Line	Boston / Roxbury
Washington Street	6, 7	Silver Line	Boston / Roxbury
Dudley Square	7	Silver Line	Boston / Roxbury
Crosstown Center	6, 7		Boston / Roxbury
BU Medical Center	7		Boston / BU Medical Center campus
Broadway	7	Red Line	Boston / South Boston
A Street	7		Boston / South Boston
World Trade Center	7	Silver Line	Boston / Seaport

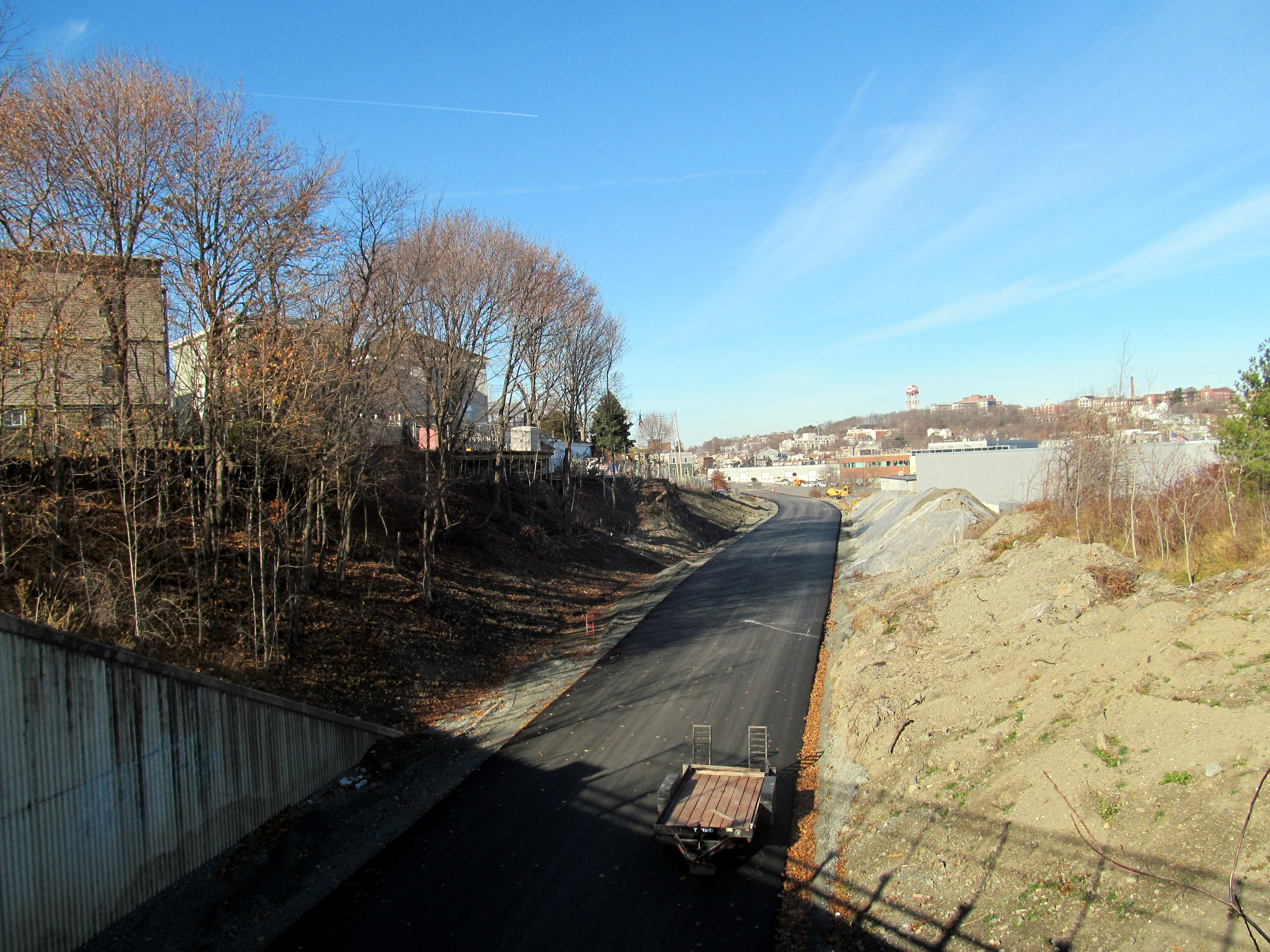
Construction of the Silver Line Gateway busway - the only part of the Urban Ring to enter construction - in Chelsea in 2015

Logan International Airport, Broadway, and Dudley Square were to be on short spurs, each served by only one route. There were to be two major spurs, both served only by the BRT 6 route. One was to JFK/UMass station, splitting from the main route near Crosstown Center with intermediate stations at Newmarket and Edward Everett Square. The other spur would run to Harvard station via Allston, with several possible alignments. Potential intermediate stations on different alignments included West Station, Cambridge Street, North Harvard Street, and Brighton Mills; all alignments included a Barrys Corner stop. A commuter rail platform was to be added at Sullivan Square to serve the Haverhill Line and Newburyport/Rockport Line.

An interim surface routing was proposed, with multiple stops in the Longwood Medical Area, while the tunnel would be under construction. The capital cost for this version of the plan was estimated at $2.2 billion, with a projected daily ridership of 170,000. Approximately 53% of the route was either in a bus-only lane, dedicated busway, or tunnel. This was increased from the previous plan for Phase 2, to improve travel times. As a result of the implementation of Phase 2, ridership growth on the Red, Orange, Blue, and Green lines would be slowed, but Commuter Rail ridership boosted. The Urban Ring would have a higher collective ridership than the Orange Line, Blue Line, or the entire Commuter Rail system.

== Phase 3 ==
Phase 3 would add a rail line on the most heavily traveled portion of the corridor, from Assembly Square in Somerville to Lechmere, Kendall Station, crossing Massachusetts Avenue near MIT, and connecting at Longwood Medical Area, Ruggles, and Nubian Square. The exact alignment would be determined through further environmental review, and included possible stops in Union Square Somerville, Cambridgeport and/or Kenmore Square, and a possible new tunnel under the Charles River.

There were three alternatives being considered for Phase 3, which differed from the alternatives described in the Major Investment Study (MIS) and Draft Environmental Impact Review (DEIR). Employment growth projections have also changed since those documents were written. The three proposed options for what type of rail service to build were:

- A light rail branch of the Green Line, mostly on the surface
- A light rail branch of the Green Line, entirely subway
- A heavy rail branch of the Orange Line, entirely subway

Estimated ridership is 282,000–293,000 passengers per day in 2025; about 47,000 would be diverted from cars, and most of the rest would be diverted from trips on congested radial lines, reducing the need to travel through downtown Boston.

== Partial implementation ==
Since the suspension of the overall project, a segment of the original route was constructed, completing in 2018. The "Silver Line Gateway" service (route SL3) has commenced, connecting Downtown and South Boston to the inner-core city of Chelsea, with an intermediate stop serving Logan Airport. The route is a mix of dedicated right-of-way and shared street traffic segments, using articulated buses.

== See also ==
- Interstate 695 (Massachusetts) – a 1960s proposed but cancelled highway involving many of the same communities
- Mid-City Transitway in Chicago, IL
