= Land banking =

Buying multiple parcels together for future use

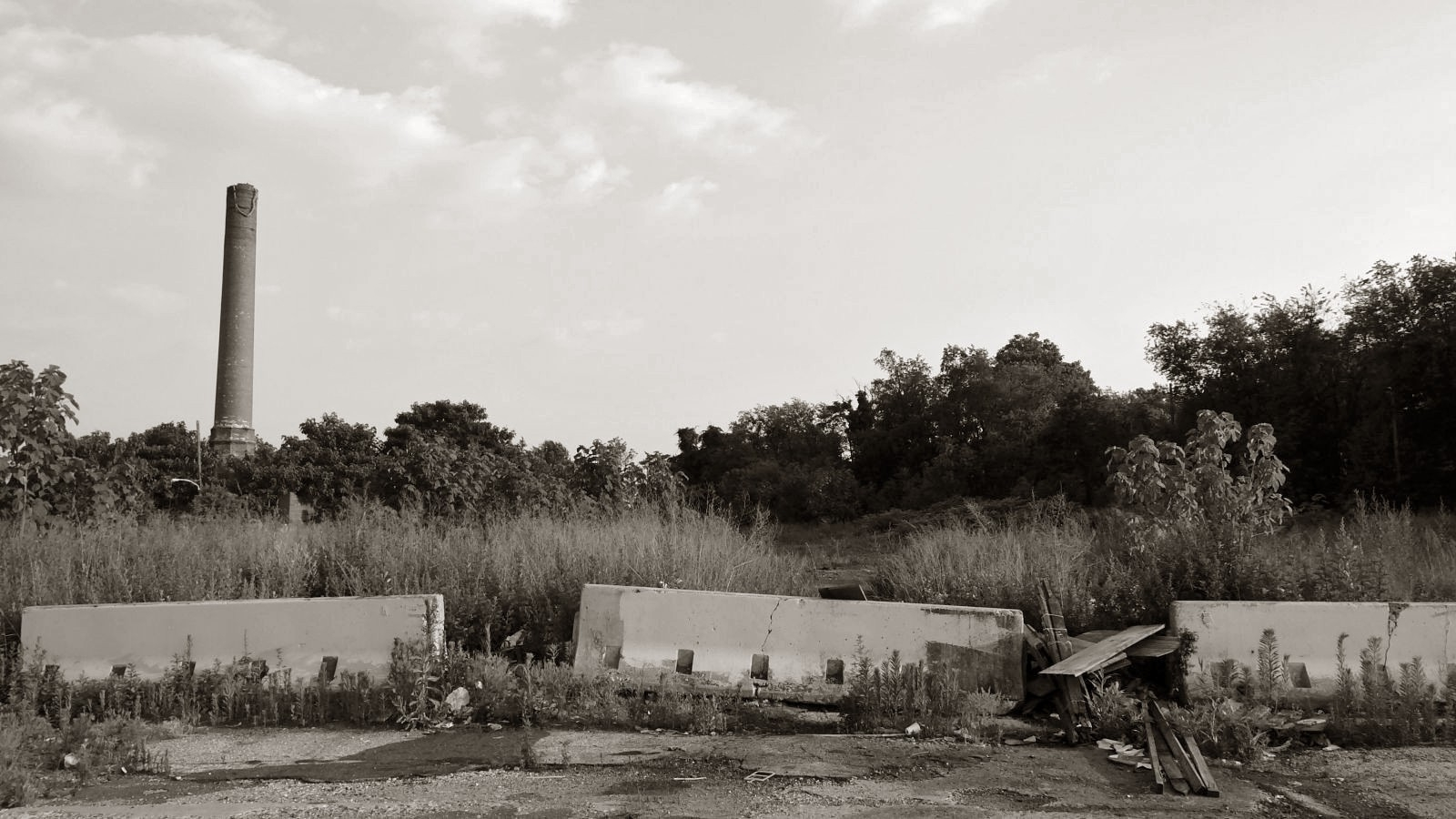
Blighted land in Philadelphia

Land banking is the practice of aggregating parcels of land for future sale or development.

While in many countries land banking may refer to various private real estate investment schemes, in the United States it refers to the establishment of quasi-governmental county or municipal authorities tasked with managing an inventory of surplus land.

In some cases the practice is run as a scam, with land being sold above its market value and its potential for future returns exaggerated.

== Municipal land banks in the United States ==
=== Definition ===
Land banks are quasi-governmental entities created by counties or municipalities to effectively manage and repurpose an inventory of underused, abandoned, or foreclosed property. They are often chartered to have powers that enable them to accomplish these goals in ways that existing government agencies can not. While the land bank "model" has gained broad support and has been implemented in a number of cities, it is implemented differently so as to best address the needs of the municipality, the state and the local legal context in which it was created.

=== History ===
Land banking originated in the 1920s and 1930s as a means of making low-priced land available for housing and ensuring orderly development. The period of deindustrialization in the United States coupled with increased suburbanization in the middle of the 20th century left many American cities with large amounts of vacant and blighted industrial, residential, and commercial property. Beginning in the early 1970s, municipalities began to seek solutions to manage decline or spur revitalization in once prosperous city neighborhoods. The first land bank was created in St. Louis in 1971. While additional municipalities continued to adopt them at a trickle it wasn't until the mid 2000s that land banks became viewed as a tested, reliable, and accepted model and experienced widespread implementation – particularly after the success of the Genesee County Land Bank. In 2009, the Department of Housing and Urban Development issued a report embracing land banks as a best practice model for municipalities dealing with the 2008 financial crisis and the ensuing foreclosure crisis.

== Investment land banking by country ==
=== United Kingdom ===
Land banking developed in the late 17th Century in the British Isles and was previously the preserve of the landed gentry or real estate developers such as Nicholas Barbon. Many reputable commercial building companies engage successfully in land banking for future building projects. Companies also purchase land sites and easily divide them into smaller plots, then offer these plots for sale to individual investors. This relatively new practice in the UK does not fall under the control of the Financial Conduct Authority. Many people are wary of this form of investment as many plot-based land banking companies have failed or been closed down. There are currently no audited successes recorded for UK plot-based land banking despite the UK having gone through a major property boom between 2002 and 2007.

A land banking scheme that is a Collective investment scheme is a "regulated activity" for the purposes of the Financial Services and Markets Act 2000 and, according to section 19(1), may only be operated in the UK by a person who is either authorised or exempt. Section 26 provides that an agreement made by a person in contravention of this is unenforceable and any sums paid to him may be recovered together with compensation for any loss suffered. After recent FCA enforcement of this regulation, many companies selling UK land plots have moved outside of the European Union and only offer land plots to non-UK residents who are not protected by FCA regulations.

==== Companies offering land banking plots in the UK ====
Since the changes in the land Registration Act, a number of companies offering UK land plots as investments have been formed. Typically this land is greenbelt, nature conservation, flood plain, agricultural or protected land unsuitable for development. There are no recorded successful planning permission applications for plots sold under such collective investment schemes.

There have been considerable losses recorded by investors in UK land plot investment schemes. A large number of British companies offering UK land plots have failed or been shut down by the Financial Services Authority (FSA) or other authorities. Some companies have now moved offshore after an FSA investigation. Some companies now offer UK land plots from locations such as Dubai or Singapore where the local authorities do not regulate such activities, or are not aware of the high risk nature of the investment. In June 2010 the Monetary Authority of Singapore (MAS) issued a warning on land banking plot schemes warning they may be scams with a specific focus on companies offering land from the UK and Canada.

==== Sales methods ====
A company representative may contact an individual by telephone, in temporary shopping center booths, or at property shows and offer a strategic land investment in the UK. Very often UK government or industry statistics, the proximity of the land to built up areas, or the recent history of UK house prices are quoted as a demonstration of why the land plot is a great investment. Verbal communication will often indicate that the land is fast tracked for building approval and has strong potential as building land. When pricing the land reference is typically made to approved building land prices at the market peak. Very often the land banking company will present detailed plans showing a housing development on the site. These plans are often referred to as "pre-approved", "concept" or "predevelopment". The sales person will focus on the potential future value of the land against the current selling price.

No reference is ever made to the value of green belts or agricultural land, or the issues involved with long-term maintenance, or collectively selling tiny plots of land. The sales price is typically increased 10–100 times over the current value of the land. Plans shown have no validity in UK planning law and cannot be considered an indication of progress in the planning process. No written contractual promise is ever given for planning permission despite the typically extreme optimism of the salesperson. The salesperson will typically never mention that the land is protected, or greenbelt land and cannot be developed under current planning regulations. There is typically no possibility of getting planning permission in any reasonable timeframe.

The investor may end up paying a considerable amount of money for a small area of low-value land which has a very high risk of standing undeveloped. Once the general public becomes aware of the lack of viability of the proposed plot investment scheme, the real value of the individual plots collapses. This is typically followed by the land plot company liquidating completely, or relocating to another legal jurisdiction.

For customers that show a willingness to purchase such schemes, there may also be attempts to sell additional plot based land banking products at alternate locations, or other high yield investment programmes. Customers may also be added to suckers lists which are then sold to other companies offering similar schemes. When the land banking plot company fails, plot investors may also be offered investment recovery or planning services for a fee. Such services typically are fraudulent or fail and lead to a further loss of money for the investor.

==== Controversies ====
A You and Yours documentary, first aired on BBC Radio 4 in December 2006, criticized the services offered by many land banking companies in the United Kingdom, suggesting that they were scamming their customers. A land banking scam is based on the very low chance of any of the plots receiving planning permission and the very high profit margins taken on the land plots, with the seller using misleading marketing tactics to convince the buyers that they are making a sound investment.

A key strategy used for selling United Kingdom land plots is to imply that because a customer owns the land plot, they cannot lose their money. The land banking company typically suggests dramatic annual increases in the value of the land plots, and a very optimistic time frame for successful planning applications. These are never contractually committed. Typically the land banking company sells a land plot at a premium of 15 to 100 times the current market value of undeveloped land. A purchaser might pay £15,000 for a land plot that only has a current market value of £500. On this basis, most of the investment is not in land, and the small percentage annual increases in the value of the land plot are meaningless. The actual investment is in a proposed service to deliver valuable approved building land in the future. If that service is never delivered or is not successful, the remaining land asset is normally worthless. Should the selling company fail or disappear, the plot owner cannot economically sell the plot, as the administrative effort and cost of sale typically exceeds the value of the land plot.

Many land banking companies target victims outside of the United Kingdom, particularly in Canada, Singapore, Thailand, Brunei and Malaysia. Residents of these countries may be naive of the UK property market and local planning regulations such as green belt zoning.

In 2008, the land banking firm UKLI was placed into administration due to insolvency, despite having taken £69 million from 4,500 people for land plots. Land International was closed down in 2008 after losing investors £10 million, and the same Land International plots were later offered for sale in Asia. In 2010, Land International (Far East) failed, causing investors to lose S$6 million (£2.5M). MP David Heath requested a debate in the House of Commons following the offering of 209 plots in the village of Dean, saying that "while land banking may not be illegal it is undoubtedly a scam".

The UK Land Registry issued a press release on January 15, 2009 advising consumers that the Land Registry has published a guide warning against land banking investment schemes. Land Registry Head of Corporate Legal Services Mike Westcott Rudd said that the public were being "misled about the prospects of obtaining planning permission", with well-known banks and developers being falsely cited as partners in the project, and that in some cases forged Land Registry paperwork was being presented to suggest that planning approval existed where it did not.

As a result of the significant controversy and media coverage land banking received, many directors and officials of companies involved were prosecuted and handed custodial sentences by the courts.

=== United States ===
==== Government ====
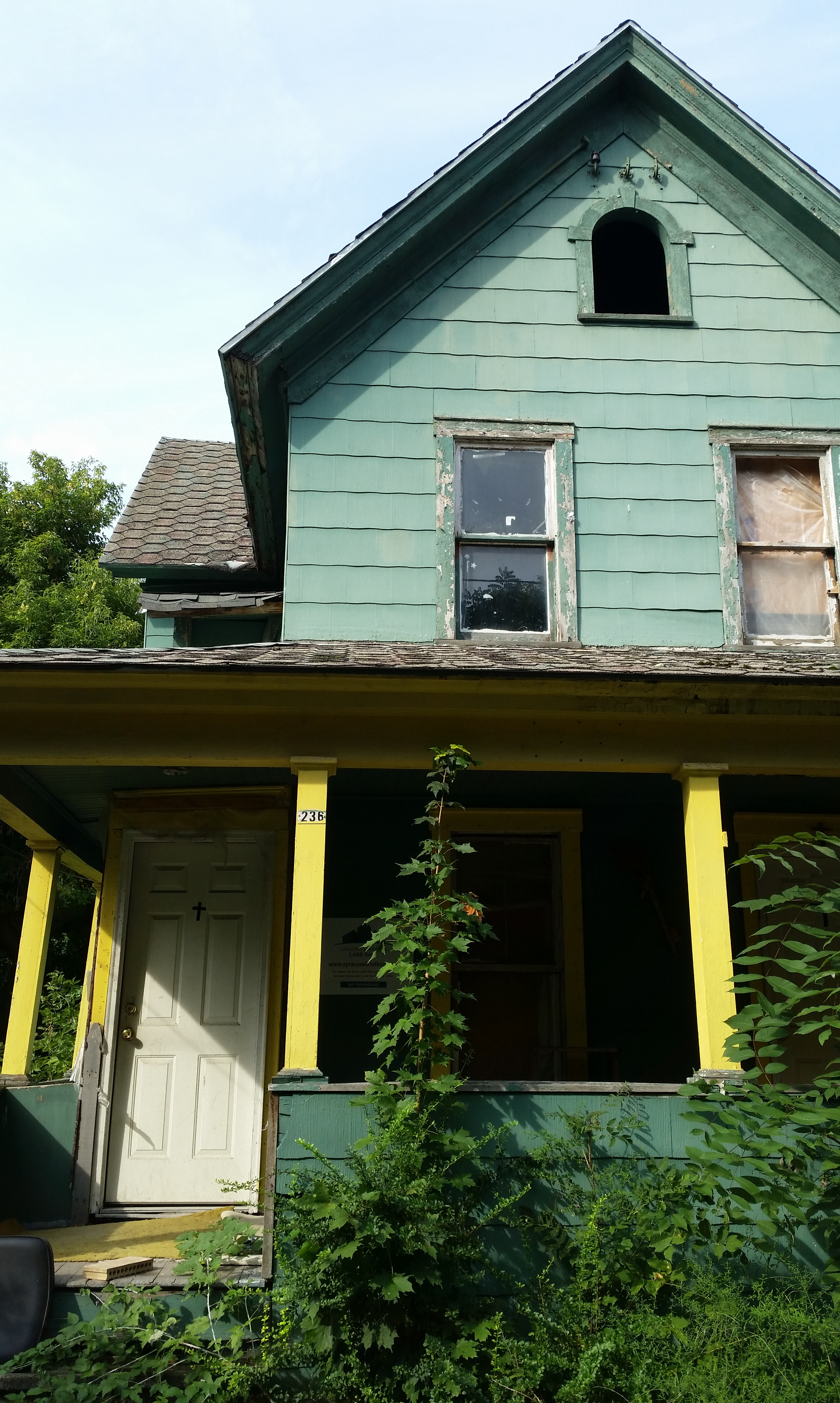
Syracuse Land Bank property, Syracuse, New York

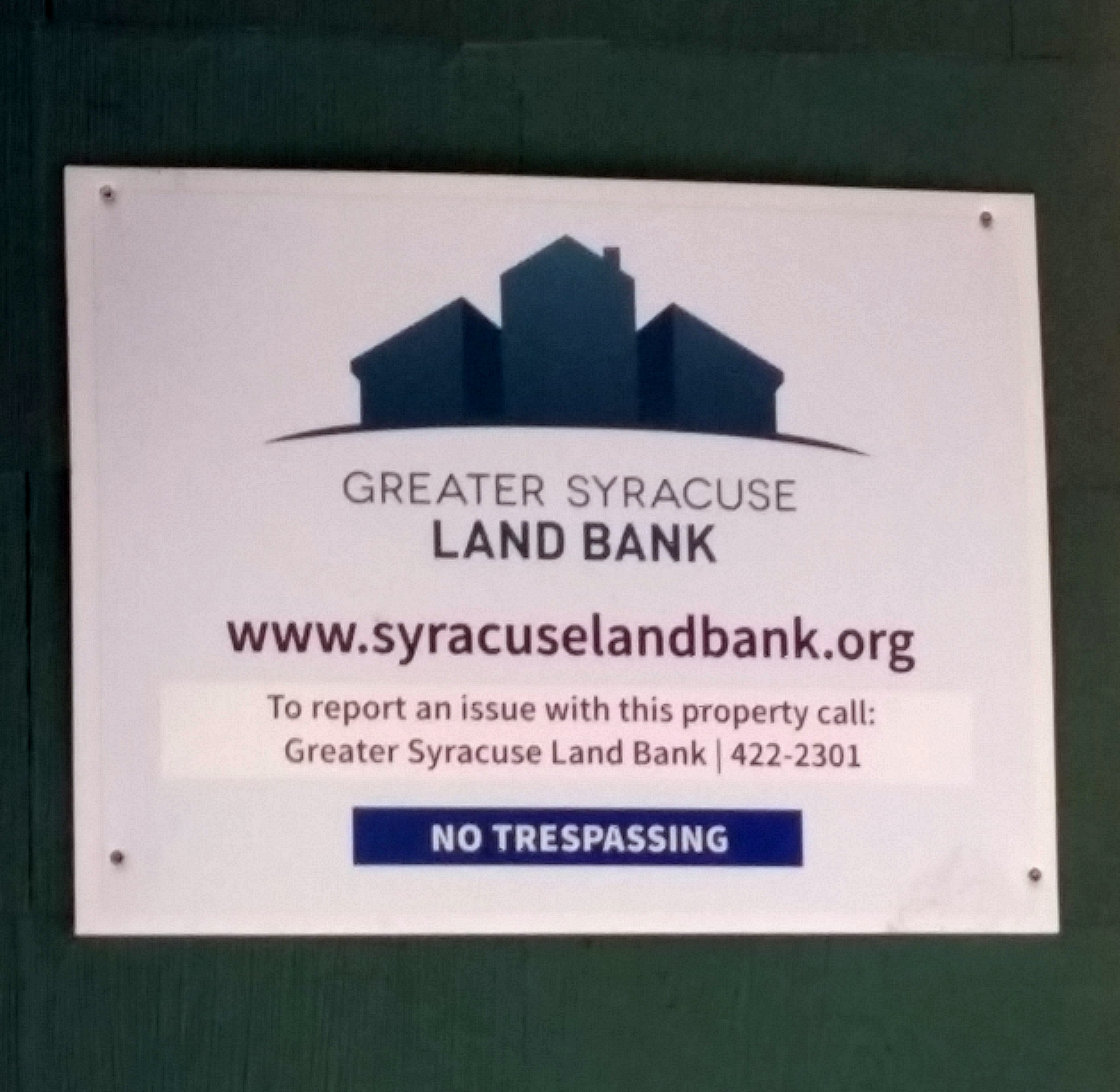
Syracuse Land Bank sign, Syracuse, New York

In 2011 New York State passed a land bank statute authorizing the establishment of nonprofits in each county to take title to vacant abandoned homes so they can be rehabilitated, sold or demolished in an orderly fashion. Many counties upstate including Erie County, Onondaga County, Schenectady County and Albany County have abandoned homes as people moved to the suburbs. Some properties have been abandoned due to back taxes and the city has taken title.

The recent robo-signing settlement gave Attorney General Eric Schneiderman the wherewithal to fund land banks in Schenectady and Albany.

The state of Michigan also has a land bank program. Ohio passed land bank legislation in 2009.

==== Commercial ====
Land banking as an investment is nothing new to America. Several self-made billionaires started by purchasing large tracts in California where the development opportunities had not yet arisen. People such as Bob Hope and Donald Trump have reaped tremendous rewards from buying large areas and holding the property until the market commanded a considerable return when sold. There have, however, also been many land scams in the US, such as the large areas of Florida swampland which were sold as being suitable for real estate.

Florida land scams have history as far back as the 1920s Florida Land Rush. Many Florida Counties have traces of these land scams today. Polk County, Florida, in particular has been devastated with land banking scams. Polk County, being the land that lies between the city of Tampa, in Hillsborough County Florida and the city of Orlando, in Orange County Florida has been a hot bed for speculative land development. North Polk County falls within the lower Green Swamp. The State of Florida has declared the Green Swamp "land of critical state concern". During the 1970s through the late 1980s the Green Swamp was sold as being suitable for real estate development. The development of Disney World and the attraction it received was the sales tool to persuade individuals to buy one acre lots at high speculative prices. These prices ranged from $2,000 to as high as $15,000 per acre. The Florida land banking scams continue today and are mostly operated outside of the United States. Unwary foreign customers are sold Florida land from outside the U.S. borders through contracts for deed arrangements.

=== Australia ===
In December 2008, during the Great Recession, the Foreign Investment Review Board (FIRB) relaxed laws regarding foreign investment in Australian real estate. Under previous legislation temporary residents were only allowed to purchase a property for Principal Place of Residence purposes valued at up to $300,000. Under new laws active since February 2009, this monetary limit has been removed.

In March 2010, the Reserve Bank of Australia governor announced that it is monitoring the effect of the rule change on the housing market.

On April 24, 2010, Assistant Treasurer Senator Nick Sherry announced the tightening of foreign investment laws as a result of a public backlash to the changes made a year earlier. Whilst they are still entitled to purchase a property of any value, temporary Residents must now sell their residence upon leaving the country, and must report all purchases to the Foreign Investment Review Board, effectively eliminating this land banking loophole. However, foreign companies are allowed to purchase property to house local staff.

It is possible for foreign individuals to create a registered company for the sole purpose of purchasing property in Australia and actively bypass the loophole fix.

As of April 20, 2010, the COAG has agreed the Housing Supply and Affordability Reform Working Party will extend the land audit work to examine ‘underused examine private holdings of large parcels of land by mid-2010.

== Agricultural land banking ==
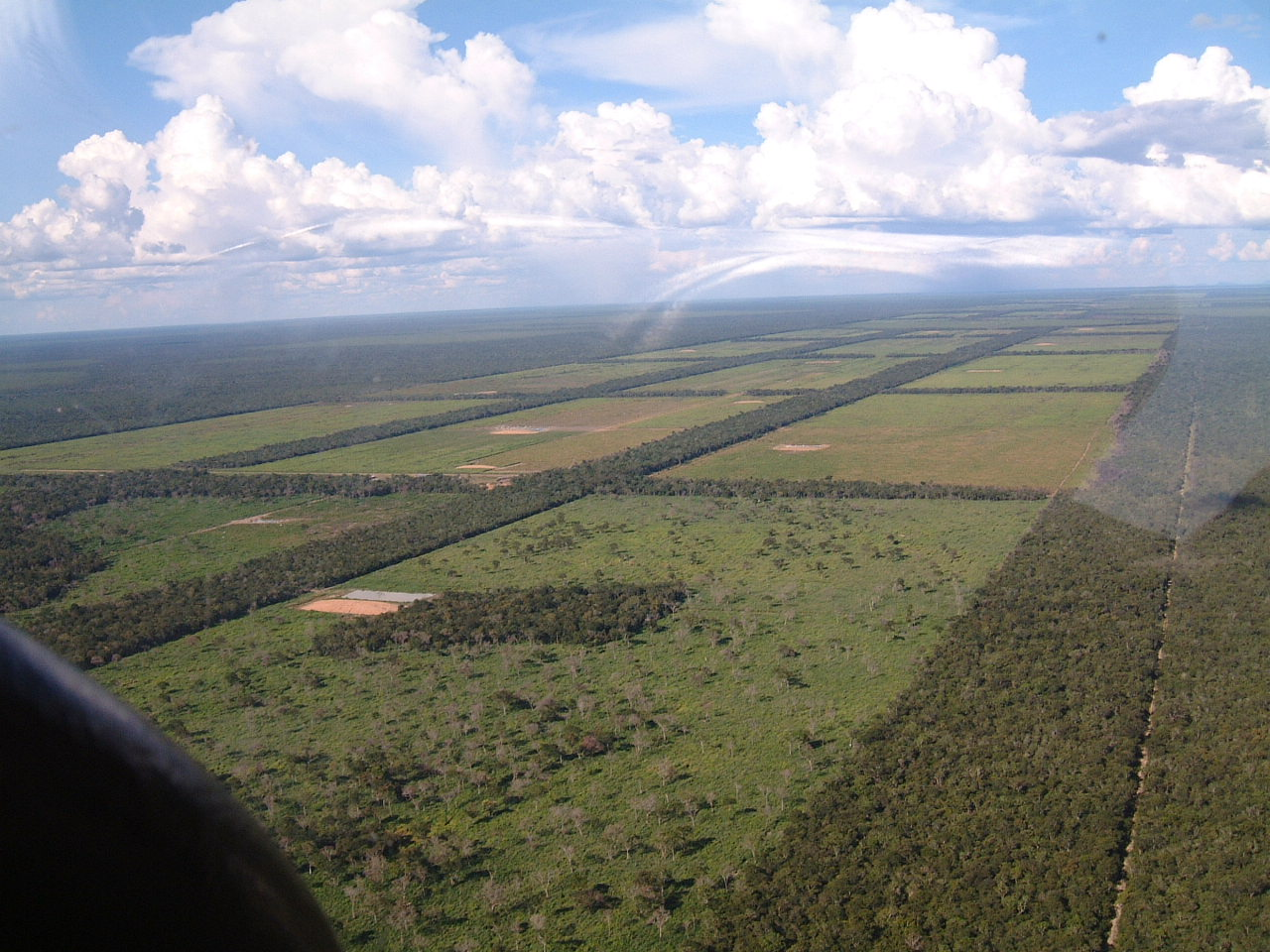
Advancing agriculture in the Paraguay Chaco.

While most land banking is based on the prospect of urban areas expanding at the expense of rural areas, agricultural land is expanding at the expense of virgin land in various parts of the world. Agricultural land banking involves purchasing virgin land that has been identified as suitable for agriculture because of its climate, topography, and soil properties, where the buyer has no intention of working the land himself or leasing it out.

When purchased by the land banking investor, such lands are often rather far away from existing infrastructure, which keeps prices low. The investor anticipates that, because of the area's natural productive potential, an agricultural infrastructure (sufficient roads, specialised contractors, grain storages) will develop, with more land put under cultivation and land values multiplying.

Agricultural land banking is found where large tracts of fertile virgin land still exist, where valuations are low and where legislation allows large land holdings (free hold) by domestic and foreign investors. Typical countries for such investments during recent years have been Argentina, Brazil, Uruguay, Paraguay where land prices appreciated accordingly.

Though the perception that the world's fertile land is a limited and valuable asset is by no means new, it received renewed public and media attention with the global food crisis, when phrases like peak wheat or peak soil were coined.

== See also ==
- Land economy
- Landlord
- Land recycling
- Land reform
- Planning permission
