= Bellingham Square Historic District =

Historic district in Massachusetts, United States

- U.S. National Register of Historic Places
- U.S. Historic district
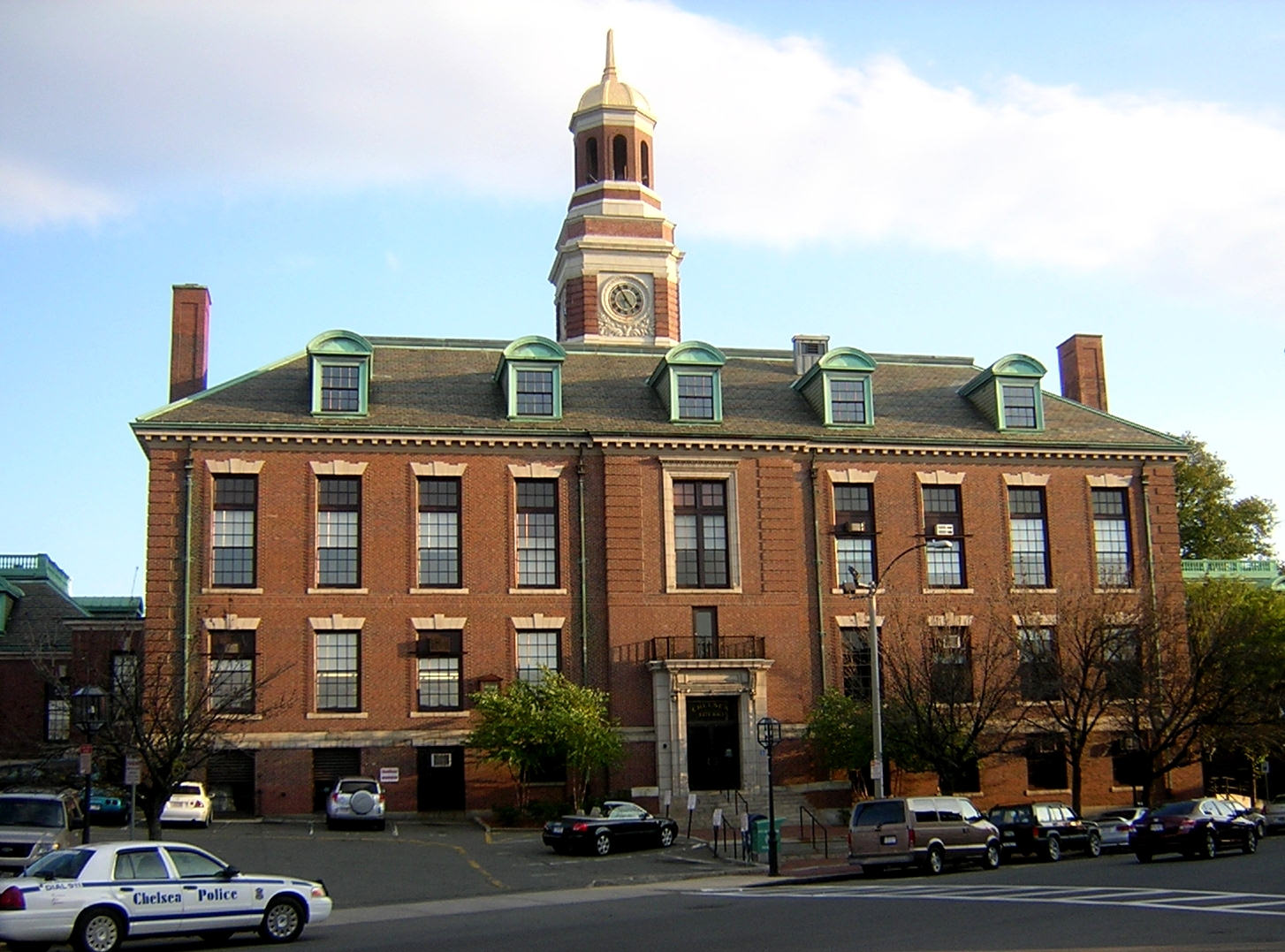
- City Hall

- Location within Massachusetts Location within the United States
- Location: Roughly bounded by Broadway, Shawmut, Chestnut, and Shurtleff Sts. Chelsea, Massachusetts
- Coordinates: 42°23′34″N 71°2′0″W
- Area: 30 acres (12 ha)
- Built: 1908
- Architectural style: Colonial Revival, Classical Revival
- NRHP reference No.: 85000030
- Added to NRHP: January 3, 1985

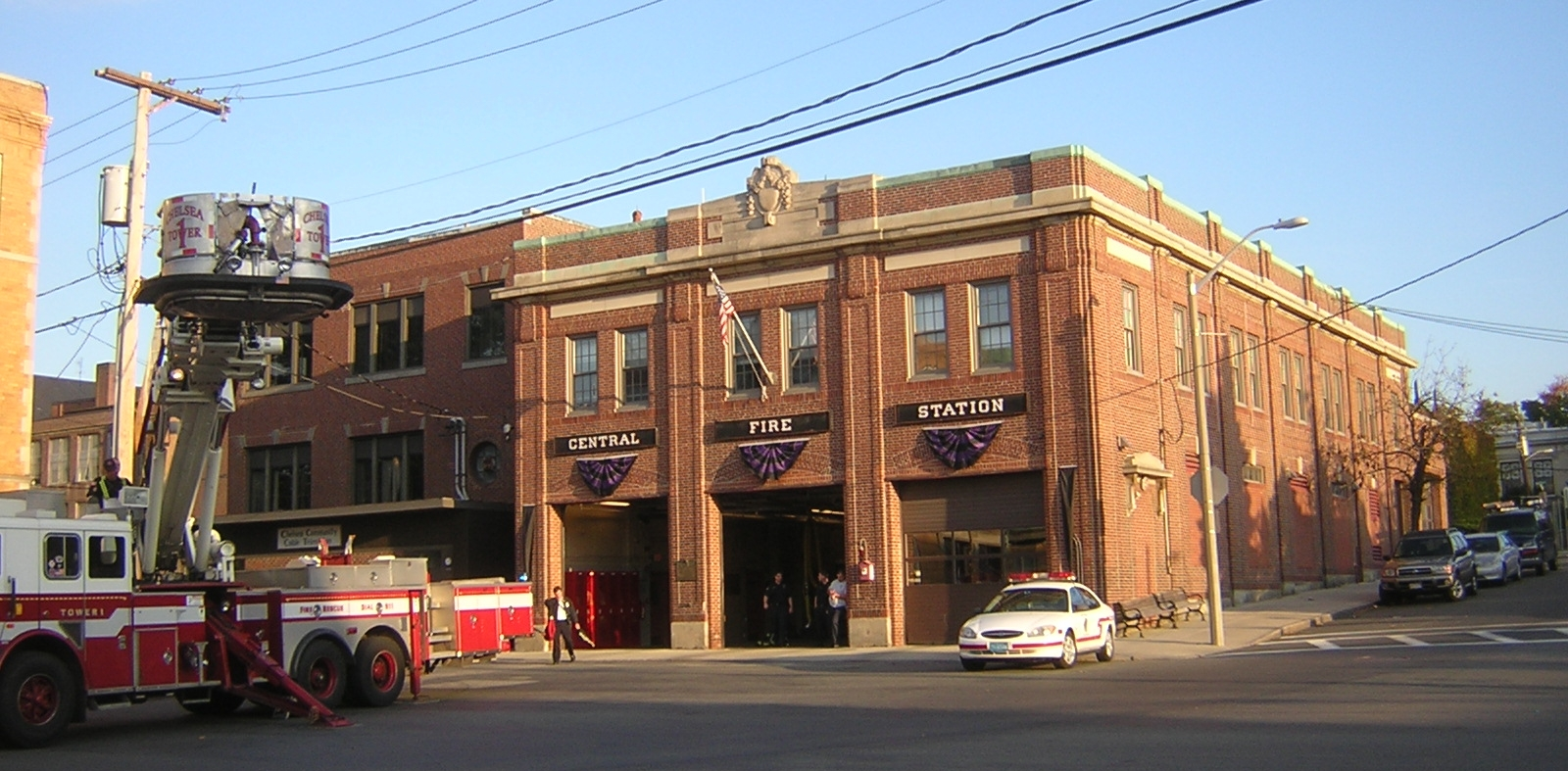
Chelsea Central Fire Station

Bellingham Square Historic District is a historic district encompassing the civic and commercial heart of Chelsea, Massachusetts. Roughly bounded by Broadway, Shawmut, Chestnut, and Shurtleff Streets, the district was almost entirely built in the aftermath of the Great Chelsea Fire of 1908, and is a monument to the civic planning that took place at the time. The district was added to the National Register of Historic Places in 1985.

== Description and history ==
Bellingham Square is centered on the six-way junction of Broadway, Washington Avenue, Bellingham Street, Hawthorn Street, and 5th Street. The historic district radiates away from this junction and the adjacent City Hall to include civic commercial and residential buildings. The square is home to the Chelsea Public Library and a former satellite facility of Bunker Hill Community College was once located in the former post office.

Chelsea was settled by English colonists in 1624, and was made part of Boston after that city was founded in 1630. It was separately incorporated in 1739, and developed in the 19th century as an industrial center, based first around wooden shipbuilding and then other industries. It was reincorporated as a city in 1857. On April 12, 1908, the Great Chelsea Fire of 1908 destroyed the city's commercial and civic heart, as well as 3,000 structures in a 500-acre (200 ha) area. In the wake of this disaster, the state assumed control of the city, and set in motion a modern (for the period) urban planning process to rebuild the fire-ravaged area. New codes governing zoning, building inspection and construction, and fire codes were introduced, and land use of the affected areas was planned. Major architects designed the city's iconic city hall (Peabody and Stearns), library, and post office (both Guy Lowell). The city's then-sizable Jewish population was recognized in the construction of the Chelsea Free Hebrew School, designed by Jewish architect Samuel Eisenberg.

== See also ==
- National Register of Historic Places listings in Suffolk County, Massachusetts
