= Courthouse station (MBTA) =

Bus rapid transit station in Boston, Massachusetts, US

Courthouse
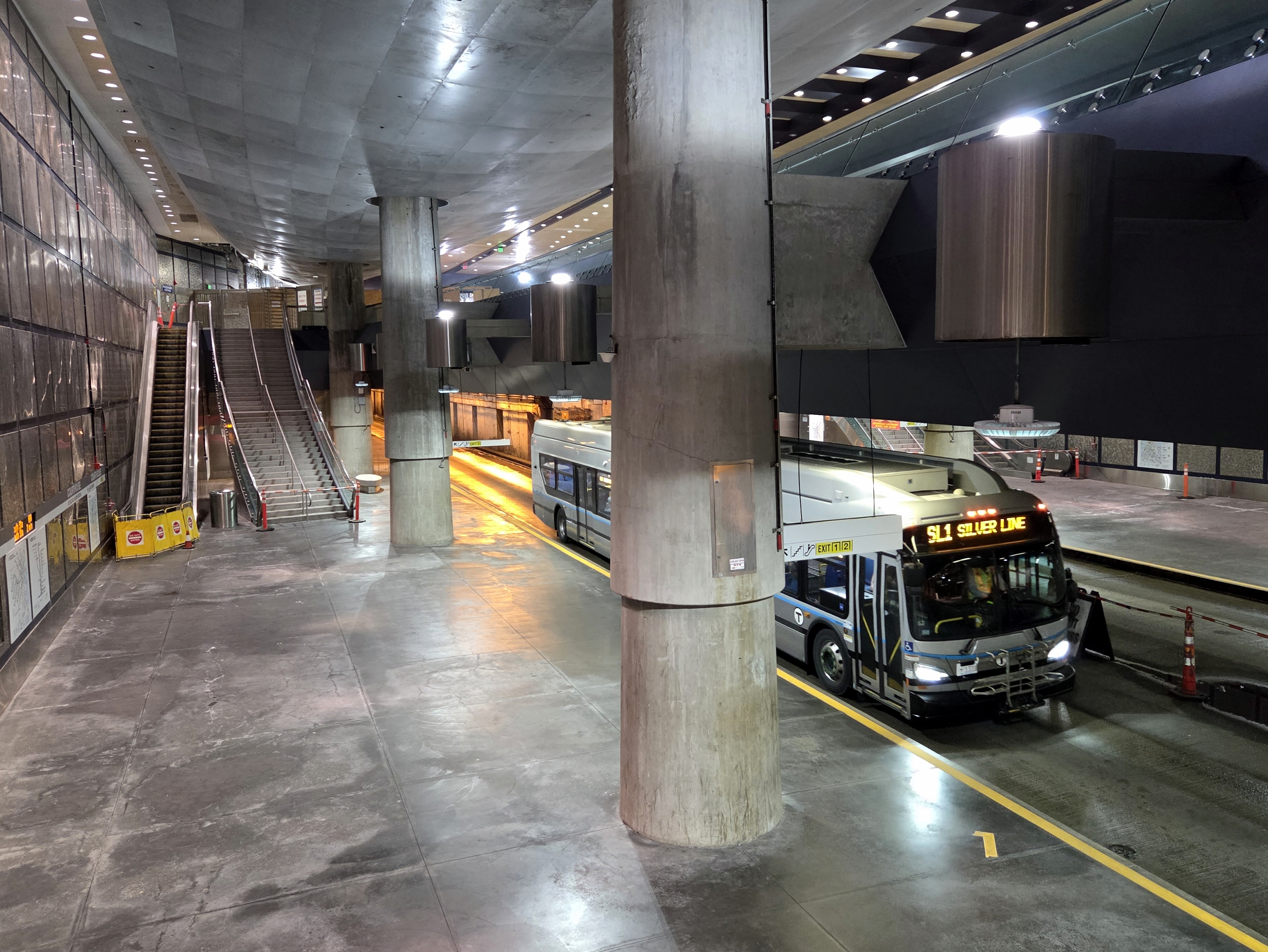
- An inbound bus at the station in 2025

General information
- Location: Seaport Boulevard at Fan Pier Boulevard; South Boston, Boston, Massachusetts
- Coordinates: 42.3523°N 71.0466°W
- Line: South Boston Piers Transitway
- Platforms: 2 side platforms
- Connections: MBTA bus: 4

Construction
- Accessible: Yes

History
- Opened: December 17, 2004

Passengers
- FY2019: 2,530 daily boardings

Services
Preceding station	MBTA	Following station
South Station Terminus	Silver Line SL1	World Trade Center toward Logan Airport terminals
South Station Terminus	Silver Line SL2	World Trade Center toward Design Center
South Station Terminus	Silver Line SL3	World Trade Center toward Chelsea
South Station Terminus	Silver Line SLW	World Trade Center toward Silver Line Way
Former services
Preceding station	MBTA	Following station
South Station Terminus	Silver Line SL3 Closed 2009	World Trade Center toward City Point
Location

Courthouse station is an underground bus rapid transit station on the MBTA's Silver Line, located under Seaport Boulevard at Thomson Street on the South Boston Waterfront. It is named for the John Joseph Moakley United States Courthouse which is one block to the north on Fan Pier. The station also serves the Fort Point neighborhood, the Institute of Contemporary Art, Boston, and nearby residential and commercial development. Like all Silver Line stations, Courthouse station is accessible.

== Station design ==
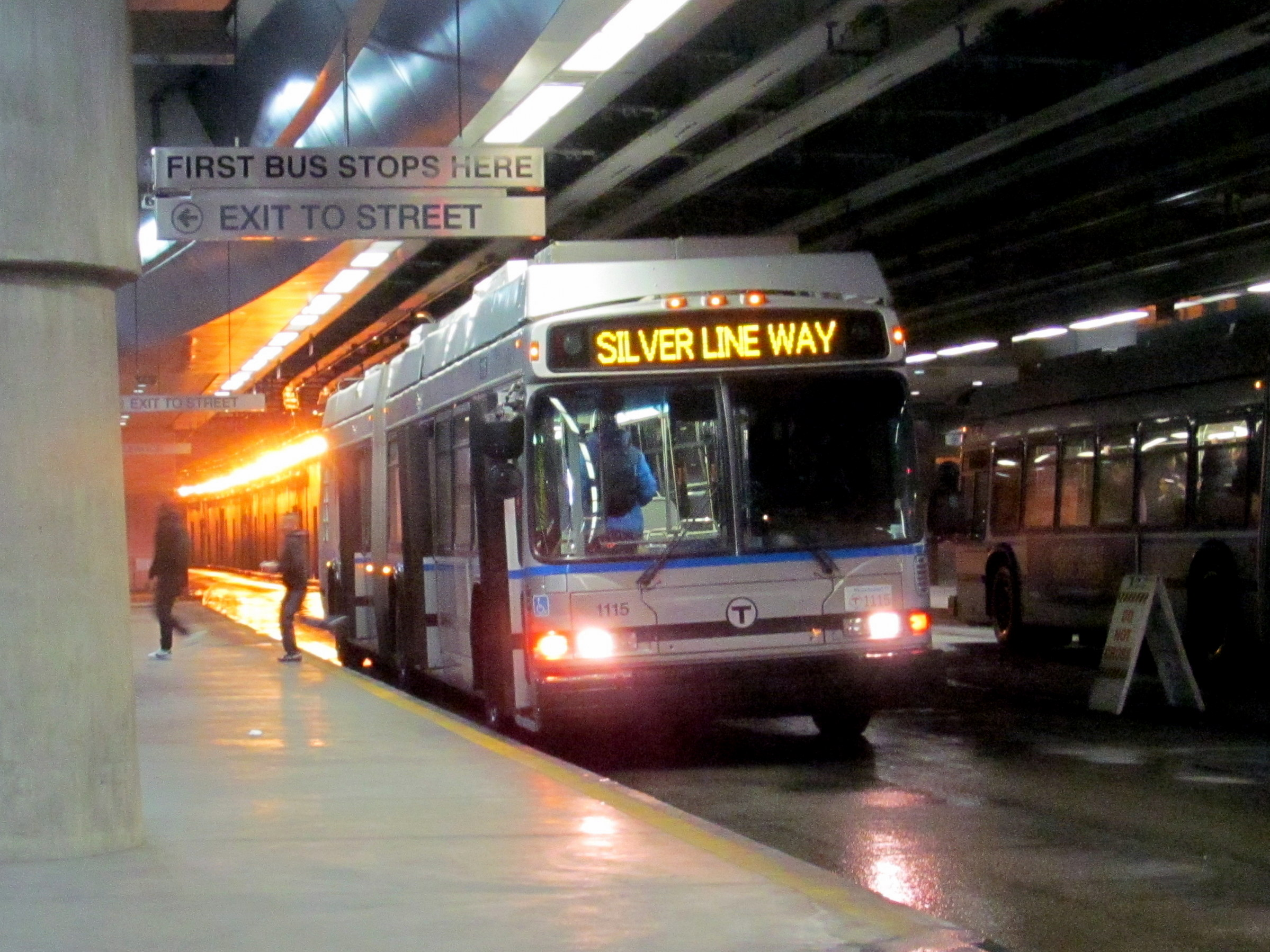
An outbound bus at the station in 2017

Construction of the $110 million station was technically demanding, as the Waterfront district is built on fill rather than solid ground or rock. Slurry walls and large braces were built, allowing 210,000 cubic yards of soil to be excavated for the platform area. The station was called Fan Pier during early planning until it was determined that the federal courthouse would be located nearby. Because the station was initially surrounded by parking lots, its original headhouses were intended to be temporary until development occurred. The station was also designed to allow two future entrances at the east end of the mezzanine if needed.

The station was intended as the centerpiece of the Silver Line and a key feature of Boston's Innovation district, with a visual impact significantly different from other stations in the MBTA system. It includes "some of the most complex and ornate station finishes installed in any MBTA transportation facility to date" which cost $30 million to complete. The lobby includes a polished stone floor and distinctive purple overhead lighting fixtures, while both the platforms have brushed steel finishes on support columns and walls. The station was turned into an "idea lab" nightclub and conference center in June 2014 for Boston Idea Week, which included several other MBTA-centered events.

== History ==
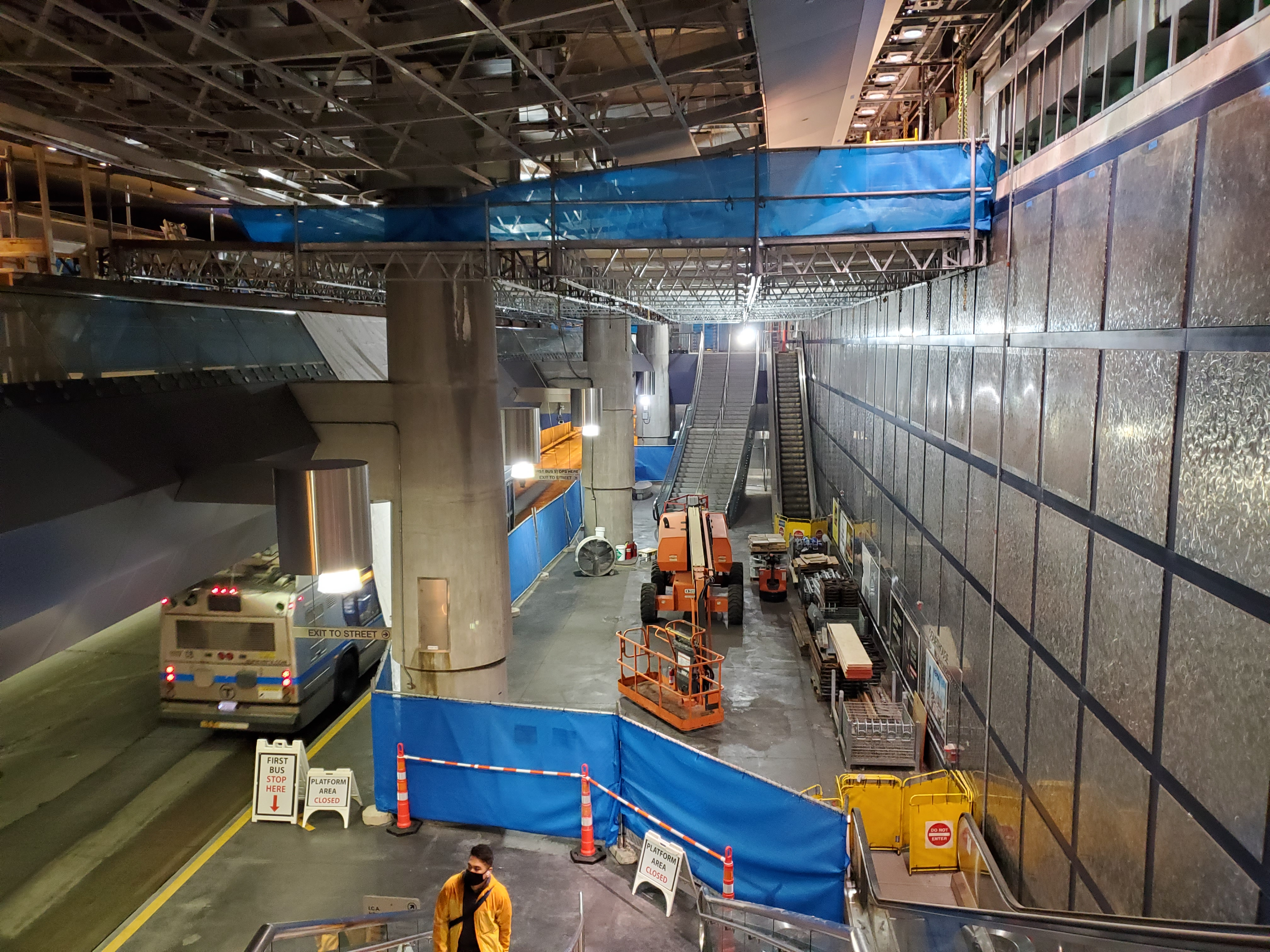
Repair work in July 2021

Courthouse station opened along with the rest of the South Boston Piers Transitway from South Station to Silver Line Way on December 17, 2004. Through service on the SL2 and SL3 routes serving the Design Center and City Point areas began on December 31, 2004, followed by SL1 service on June 1, 2005. SL3 service was discontinued on March 20, 2009.

The station has headhouses on the north and south sides of Seaport Boulevard. The south headhouse was closed from October 5, 2015 until October 2016 due to construction of a hotel partially over the headhouse. SL3 service (a new South Station–Chelsea route different from the discontinued City Point route) at the station began on April 21, 2018.

The station suffers from water infiltration from several sources, which has damaged ducts and electrical conduits. A $26.9 million contract for waterproofing and repairs was approved by the MBTA in December 2020, with construction then expected to take place from January 2021 to early 2023. Construction of a northeast headhouse with a separate elevator is also underway. Bidding began in December 2020, with notice to proceed given on a $15.3 million contract in June 2021. It was expected to be complete by the end of 2022.
