= Broadway station (MBTA) =

Subway station in Boston, Massachusetts, US

Broadway
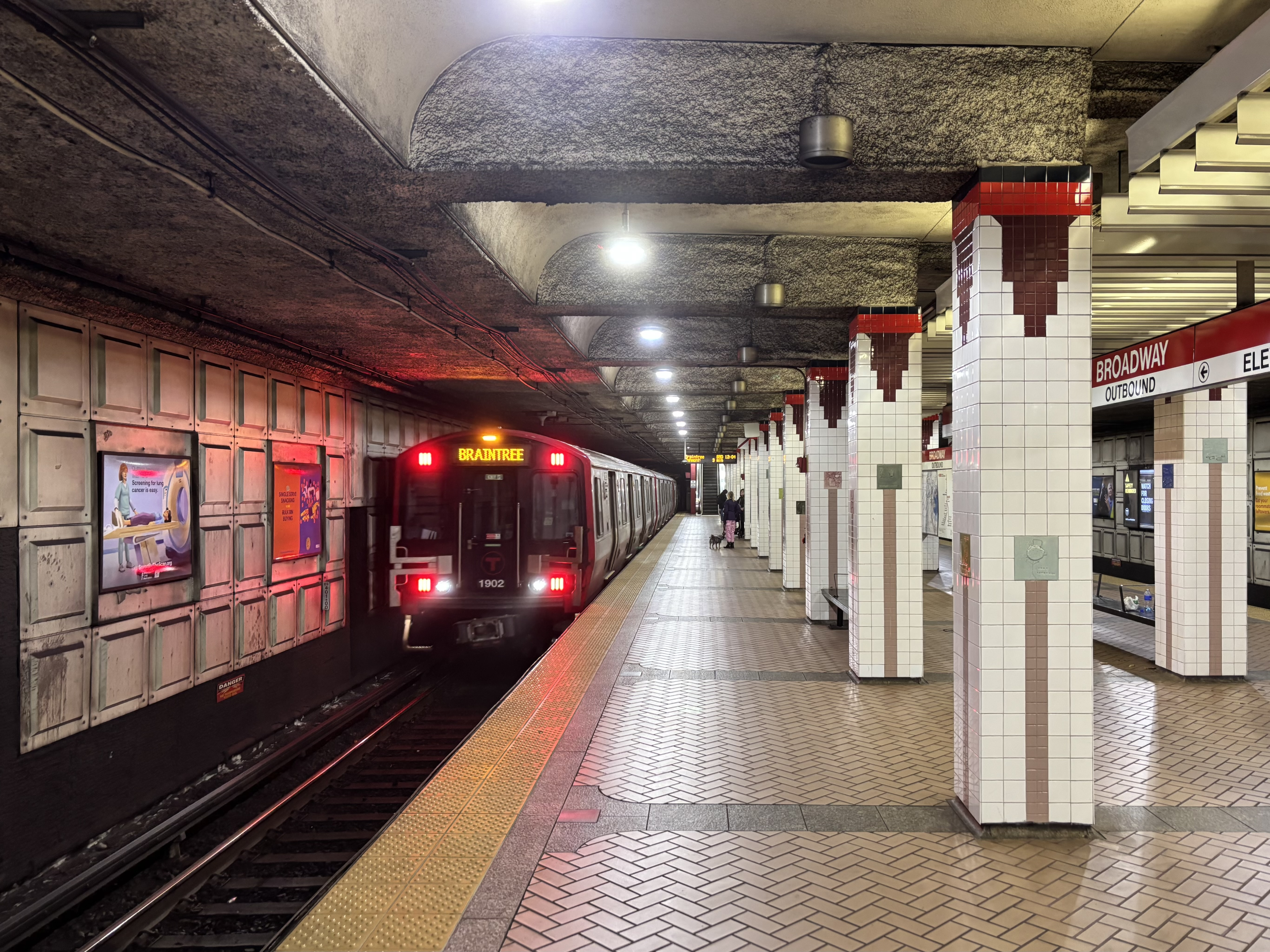
- A southbound train entering Broadway station in 2025

General information
- Location: Dorchester Avenue at Broadway; South Boston, Boston, Massachusetts
- Coordinates: 42.3423°N 71.0571°W
- Line: Dorchester Tunnel
- Platforms: 1 island platform
- Tracks: 2
- Connections: MBTA bus: 9, 11, 47

Construction
- Structure type: Underground
- Accessible: Yes

History
- Opened: December 15, 1917
- Rebuilt: 1985

Passengers
- FY2019: 6,020 daily boardings

Services
Preceding station	MBTA	Following station
South Station toward Alewife	Red Line	Andrew toward Ashmont or Braintree
Former services (South Boston station)
Preceding station	New York, New Haven and Hartford Railroad	Following station
Boston Terminus	Boston–Mattapan	Crescent Avenue toward Mattapan
Boston Terminus	Boston–Braintree	Crescent Avenue toward Braintree
Boston Terminus	Boston–Readville via Midland Branch	Uphams Corner toward Readville
Location

Broadway station is a subway station in Boston, Massachusetts. It serves the MBTA's Red Line. It is located at the intersection of Dorchester Avenue and Broadway in South Boston. It was opened on December 15, 1917, as part of the Dorchester Extension from Downtown Crossing (formerly Washington station) to Andrew. The station has a single island platform to serve the two tracks.

== History ==
=== Railroad stations ===
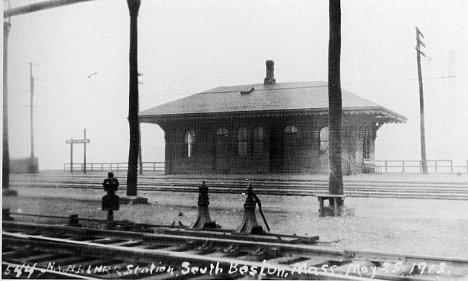
South Boston station in 1913

The Old Colony Railroad was built along the west edge of South Boston next to the Bass River in 1845. South Boston station was opened just south of the Dover Street (West 4th Street) bridge by the late 1860s. The New York and New England Railroad (NY&NE) had its own South Boston station on the Midland Branch, located at West 1st Street near B Street. In use around the 1880s, it was closed no later than 1896, when Midland Branch service was rerouted to the Old Colony terminal during construction of South Station.

Both the Old Colony and the NY&NE were absorbed by the New Haven Railroad in the 1890s as the Old Colony Division and Midland Division. By 1915, South Boston station was primarily served by Boston–Mattapan (Shawmut Branch) service, plus a small number of Midland Division trains and Old Colony Division trains to/from Braintree or points south. The station closed around the time that Broadway station opened, though it reopened briefly in July 1919 during a strike that shut down subway and streetcar service.

=== Construction ===
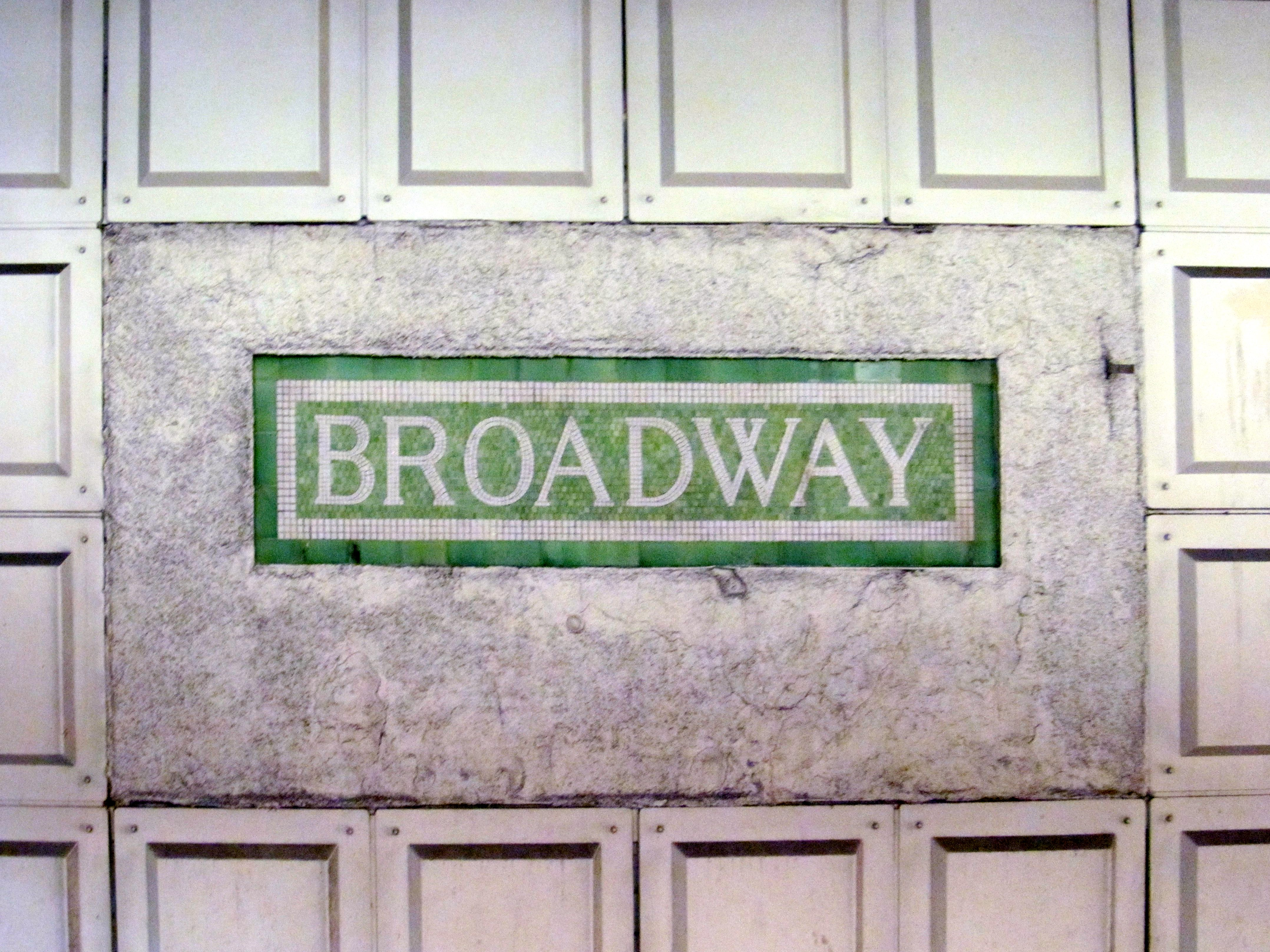
An original tiled mosaic station sign

After the Cambridge Tunnel was completed between Harvard and Park Street in 1912, work began to extend the line south to Dorchester. Rather than being opened all at once, the second section was opened station-by-station as soon as possible due to popularity. Extensions opened to Washington (Downtown Crossing) in 1915, South Station Under in 1916, and to Broadway on December 15, 1917. Broadway was the southern terminus of the line until Andrew opened on June 29, 1918. With the exception of Park Street - which was built with three platforms to handle crowds - Broadway was the only station on the original Cambridge-Dorchester Tunnel with an island platform (rather than two side platforms) in order to facilitate transfers through its three levels. Not until the aboveground Columbia and Savin Hill stations opened in 1927 were there other island platforms used on the line.

Broadway station was originally built as a three-level station, with six stairways to allow easy transfer between streetcars and subway trains. Some streetcars stopped at a surface-level platform, others in a tunnel segment just below ground, while subway trains used the lowest-level tunnel. Each level consisted of two tracks and an island platform. The street-level platform served streetcars that ran from the Tremont Street Subway to City Point and South Boston via the Pleasant Street Portal and Broadway, on the route 9 streetcar line. Buses replaced the single line to Bay View (which originally used the middle-level tunnel segment) in 1929, but the City Point line lasted until March 1, 1953, before being bustituted.

=== Renovations ===
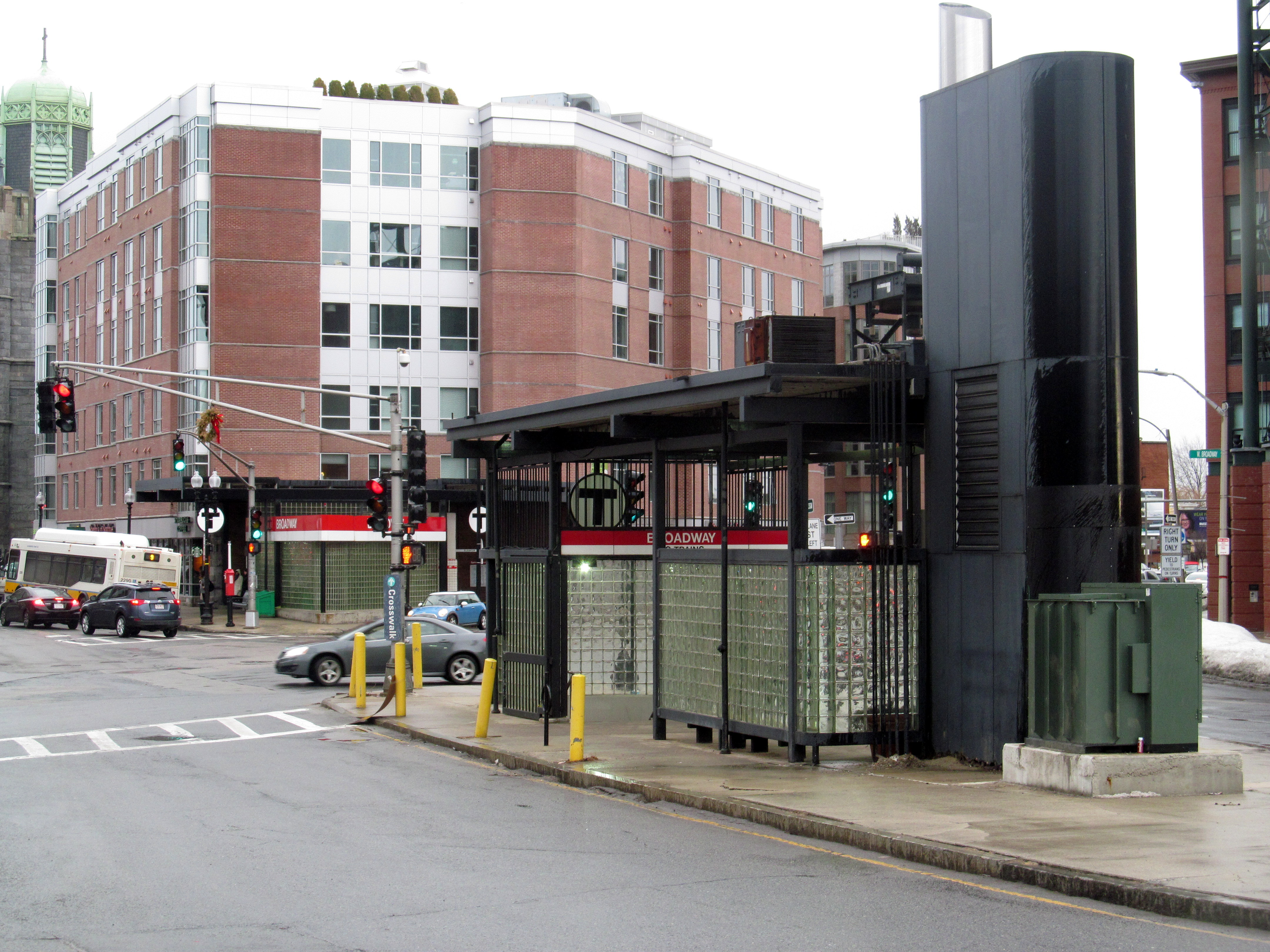
The 1980s renovation modified the near headhouse and added the far entrance

In the mid-1980s, the MBTA spent $80 million to extend the platforms of seven underground Red Line stations and three Orange Line stations to allow the use of six-car trains. Contracts for Broadway and three other stations were awarded on December 18, 1985, with a groundbreaking held on February 13, 1986. The Broadway work cost $7.9 million, with the platform extended by 70 feet (21 m). Six-car trains entered service on January 21, 1988. A new entrance east of Dorchester Avenue opened on February 16, 1988, and the project was completed on October 26, 1989. Elevators were installed during the project, making Broadway one of the first older stations on the system to be modified for accessibility.

As part of the Arts on the Line program, two works of public art were installed:

- Domestic Objects & Tools of the Trade by Jay Coogan: 60 enameled steel sculptures suspended over the platform stairs
- 200 engraved ceramic tiles by students at the nearby St. Brigid's School

Broadway was a proposed stop on the Urban Ring – a circumferential bus rapid transit (BRT) line designed to connect the existing radial MBTA rail lines to reduce overcrowding in the downtown stations. Under draft plans released in 2008, a westbound stop was to be located on the Broadway Bridge approach west of Dorchester Avenue, with the eastbound stop adjacent to the main station headhouse. The project was cancelled in 2010.

The MBTA plans to add a third headhouse with two elevators at the southwest corner of Dorchester Avenue and West 4th Street, which will provide redundant elevator access to the station. The existing elevators will also be rebuilt. A $6.6 million design contract for Broadway and Davis was awarded in April 2020. Design work for Broadway reached 30% completion in 2021 and was nearly 75% complete by November 2023.

=== Streetcar tunnel ===
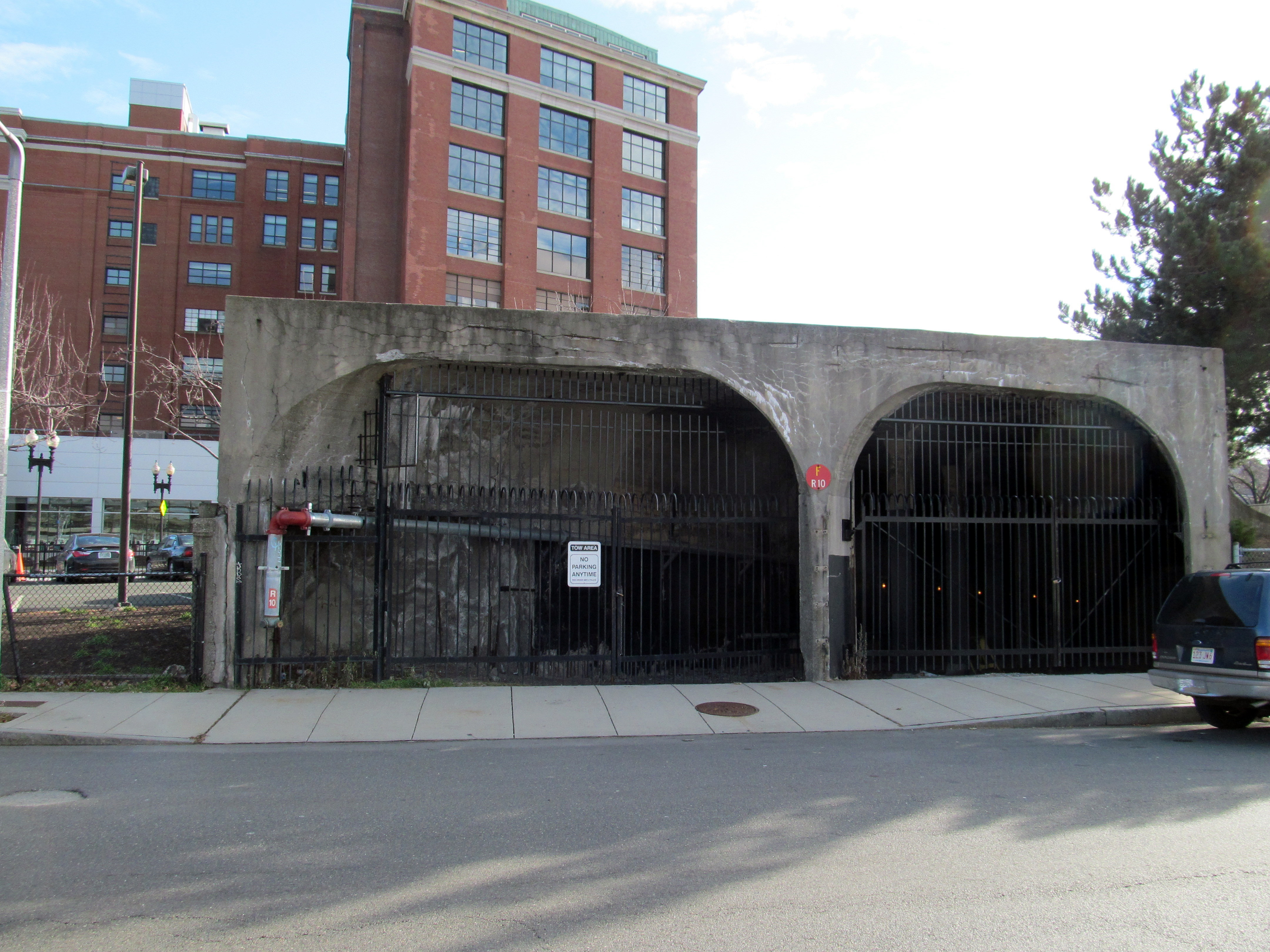
Foundry Street Portal in early 2012

The middle-level streetcar tunnel ran from a portal on Foundry Street south to another in the median of Dorchester Avenue. Service lasted for under two years' time, until October 14, 1919 - just after Andrew opened - since Andrew provided more convenient service to South Boston and eliminated unprofitable running on an industrial section of Dorchester Avenue. The Dorchester Avenue portal was filled in December 1941, but much of the tunnel still exists.

The streetcar tunnel saw several adaptive reuses. In the 1930s, the Boston Elevated Railway attempted to grow mushrooms in the tunnel, and in the 1980s it was used to test tactile platform edging for blind passengers. The 1985-built fare lobby occupies a section of the old streetcar platform and tunnel. After the September 11th attacks focused attention on infrastructure safety preparedness, the MBTA used the tunnel to train firefighters to respond to a burning train.

In mid 2012, the MBTA started construction on an $10 million emergency training center located in the old streetcar tunnel, to replace the previous equipment. The $8.8 million facility, paid for with Department of Homeland Security funding, includes two Blue Line and one Green Line cars plus a Silver Line bus. The first Blue Line car was lowered into the Foundry Street Portal by crane in September 2012. The facility opened on June 12, 2013.
