= Herald Street station =

Bus stop in Boston, Massachusetts, US

Herald Street
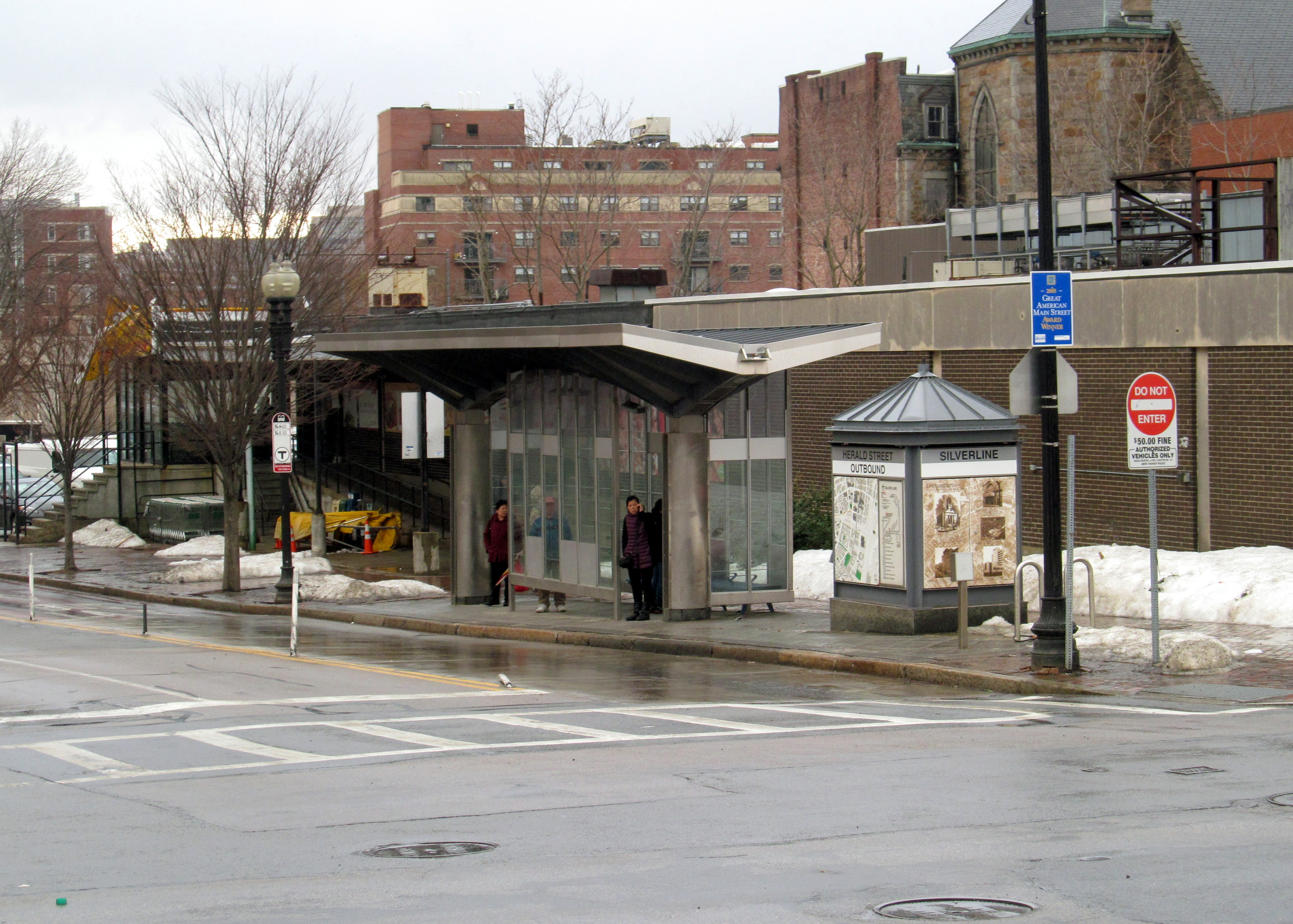
- The outbound shelter at Herald Street in March 2015

General information
- Location: Washington Street at Herald Street; Boston, Massachusetts
- Coordinates: 42.3464°N 71.0648°W
- Connections: MBTA bus: 9, 11

Construction
- Cycle facilities: 2 spaces
- Accessible: Yes

History
- Opened: July 20, 2002

Passengers
- 2012: 575 (weekday average boardings)

Services
Preceding station	MBTA	Following station
East Berkeley Street toward Nubian	Silver Line SL4	Tufts Medical Center toward South Station
East Berkeley Street toward Nubian	Silver Line SL5	Tufts Medical Center toward Downtown Crossing
Location

Herald Street station is a street-level bus station on the Washington Street branch of the MBTA MBTA Silver Line bus rapid transit service. It is located on Washington Street just south of Herald Street in the South End neighborhood of Boston, Massachusetts. In late 2017, the inbound stop was moved half a block north due to adjacent construction. The stop is served by the SL4 and SL5 Silver Line routes as well as several local MBTA bus routes. Like all Silver Line stops, Herald Street is accessible.

Silver Line service on Washington Street began on July 20, 2002, replacing the route 49 bus. Service levels doubled on October 15, 2009, with the introduction of the SL4 route.
