= Silver Line Way station =

Bus rapid transit station in Boston, Massachusetts, US

Silver Line Way
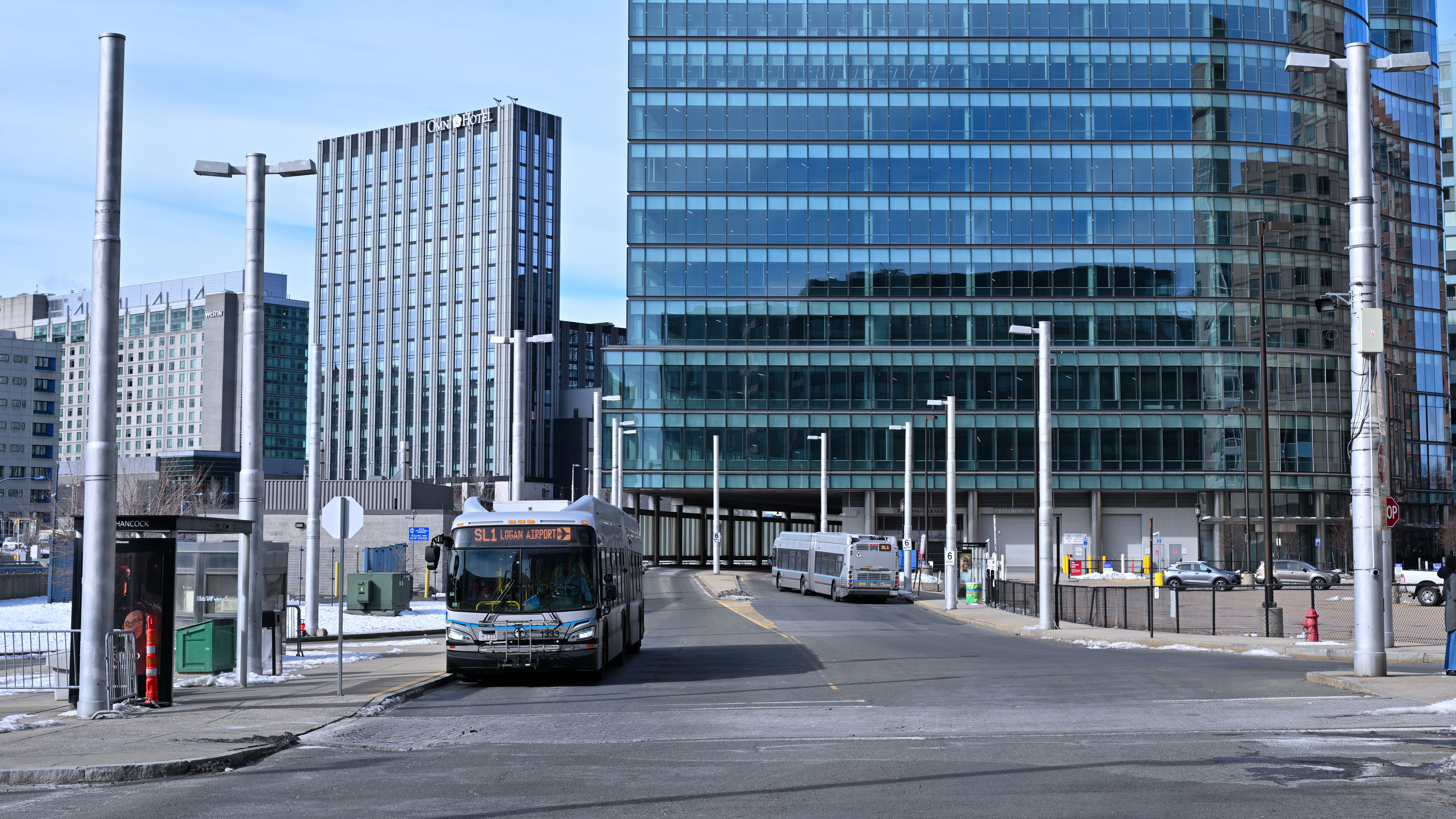
- Silver Line Way in 2025

General information
- Location: Silver Line Way at Pumphouse Road; South Boston, Boston, Massachusetts
- Coordinates: 42.3472°N 71.0386°W
- Platforms: 2 side platforms

Construction
- Accessible: Yes

History
- Opened: December 17, 2004

Passengers
- 2014: 870 (weekday average boardings)

Services
Preceding station	MBTA	Following station
World Trade Center toward South Station	Silver Line SL1	Logan Airport terminals Terminus
World Trade Center toward South Station	Silver Line SL2	Northern Avenue and Harbor Street toward Design Center
World Trade Center toward South Station	Silver Line SL3	Airport toward Chelsea
World Trade Center toward South Station	Silver Line SLW	Terminus
Former services
Preceding station	MBTA	Following station
World Trade Center toward South Station	Silver Line SL3 Closed 2009	Northern Avenue and Harbor Street toward City Point
Location

Silver Line Way station is a surface bus rapid transit station on the Massachusetts Bay Transportation Authority (MBTA) Silver Line, located on Silver Line Way between Port Lane and Starboard Lane near the South Boston Waterfront. The station is a block south of the Boston Fish Pier; it also serves the Boston Renaissance Waterfront Hotel and the Leader Bank Pavilion.

Changeover between diesel and overhead electric power formerly took place at the station. Like all Silver Line stations, Silver Line Way is accessible.

== History ==
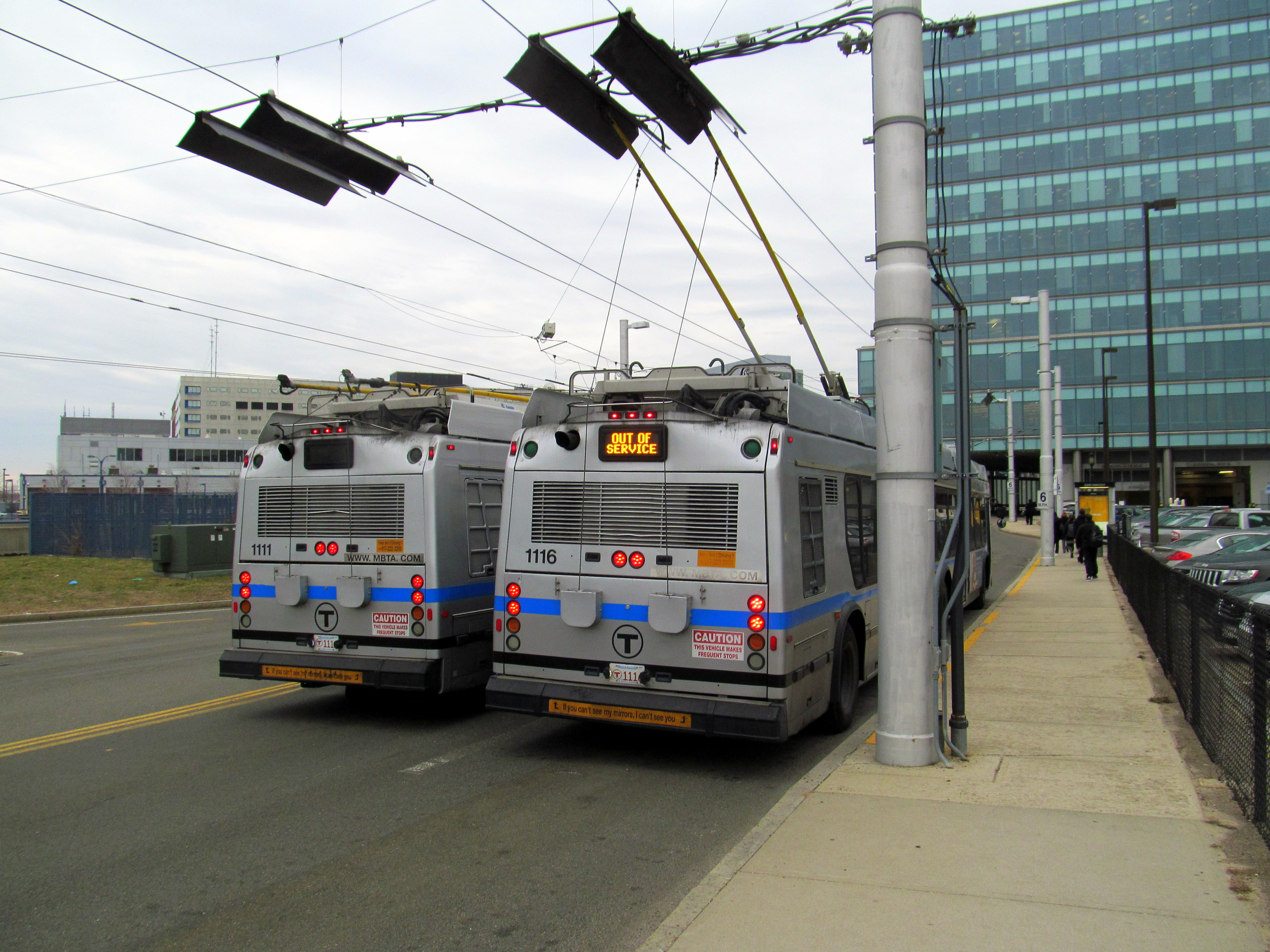
Inbound dual-mode buses in diesel mode (left) and electric mode (right) at the power changeover point at Silver Line Way in 2016; the wires have since been dismantled

The South Boston Piers Transitway between South Station and Silver Line Way opened on December 17, 2004, and SL2 and SL3 through service to the Waterfront and City Point areas began on December 31, 2004. Silver Line Way served as the transfer point between these services and diesel buses to Logan Airport beginning in January 2005 until SL1 through service began on June 1, 2005. SL3 service ended on March 20, 2009 due to low ridership, as the service was in direct competition to the more frequent route 7 bus. A different SL3 service serving Chelsea began on April 21, 2018.

Present service consists of through trips on the SL1, SL2, and SL3 routes, with some additional rush hour trips that short turn at Silver Line Way. A bus lane loops around the outbound side platform to allow the short turn buses to turn back to stop at the inbound platform and continue back into the Transitway.

In June 2019, Massport released a request for proposals for commercial development on Parcel H just north of the station, with the possibility of air rights development over the station itself. In January 2021, the board awarded a 99-year ground lease for three parcels (including Parcel H). The developer will reconstruct the Silver Line Way station with covered platforms and vertical circulation to a concourse level as part of the estimated $596 million project.

The May 2022 draft network plan called for routes SL1 and SL3 to use D Street to more directly access the Ted Williams Tunnel, with only route SL2 plus SLW shuttles serving Silver Line Way. The November 2022 revised proposal kept this change, with SL2 enhanced to higher frequency service all days.
