= Boston Neck =

Former isthmus in Boston, Massachusetts

Coordinates: 42°20′38.2″N 71°03′57.5″W

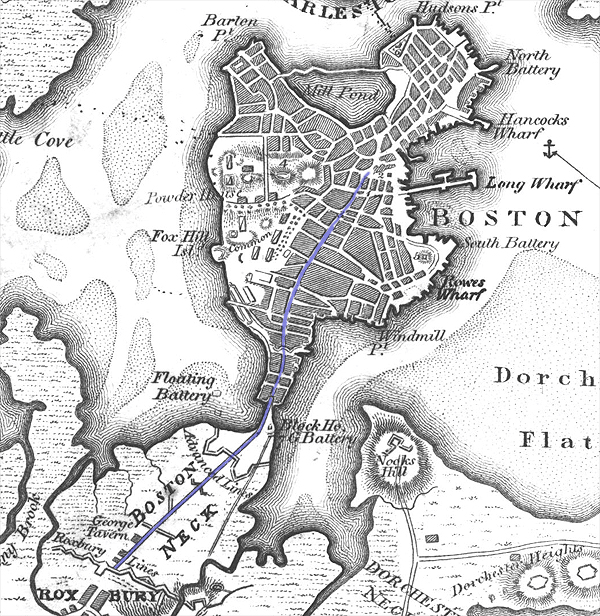
The trajectory of the Boston Neck along today's Washington Street. Land to the north and west, formerly a tidal marsh, has since been filled in. The much narrower and shorter Fort Point Channel remains to the southeast.

The Boston Neck or Roxbury Neck was a narrow strip of land connecting the then-peninsular city of Boston to the mainland city of Roxbury (now a neighborhood of Boston). The surrounding area was gradually filled in as the city of Boston expanded in population (see History of Boston). The land formerly composing the neck is part of the neighborhood now known as the South End.

== History ==
=== Early history ===
The Boston Neck was originally about 120 feet (37 m) wide at normal high tide. The first wave of settlers built a wooden town gate and earthen wall on the neck in about 1631 to prevent attacks from natives and to keep out unwanted animals and people. The gate was constantly guarded and usually locked during certain times during the evening. No residents could enter or leave during that period. There was a wooden gallows located just outside the town gate. Burglars and pickpockets were commonly executed in those days, in addition to murderers.

In colonial times, the Charles River marshes were north of the neck, and Gallows Bay was on the south side. It was so named because of the nearby executions at the neck. It later became known as South Bay. The main road through the neck was called Orange Street on Capt. John Bonner’s map of 1722.

In 1710, additional fortifications were constructed. There were supposedly two wooden gates, one for carriages and one for foot travelers. In September 1774, General Thomas Gage strengthened the old fortifications of brick, stone and earth with timber and additional earth. Gage ordered a ditch to be dug in front of the fortifications, that would fill with salt water during high tides, effectively cutting Boston off from the mainland. The neck had soft mud on both sides at low tide, making it very difficult to enter Boston on foot except through the town gate.

In 1713, one of the earliest ever prohibitions on firearms was enacted in Massachusetts. The law specifically prohibited the firing of guns near the Boston Neck due to hunters frightening horses which injured their riders passing along the road.

=== American Revolution ===
On the night of April 18, 1775, Patriot leader Doctor Joseph Warren sent Paul Revere and William Dawes on horseback with identical written messages to warn John Hancock and Samuel Adams about the British expedition to capture them and to seize the powder in Concord. Dawes, a 30-year-old Boston tanner, was well known to the British sentries at the town gate on Boston Neck and was able to pass through the checkpoint that evening despite a lockdown. Dawes traveled a southern route by land while Revere took the northern route. Dr. Warren sent both men, reckoning that at least one of them would surely be able to evade the British patrols. Dawes left about 10 P.M. and rode 17 miles (27 km) in three hours. He met with Revere shortly before 1 A.M. at the Hancock–Clarke House in Lexington, in the early morning of April 19, 1775, hours before the Battles of Lexington and Concord initiated the American Revolution.

On July 8, 1775, during the Siege of Boston, the Neck was the site of a small engagement between a handful of British regulars and two hundred Colonial volunteers. The Colonials approached to within a few hundred yards of the guardhouse through the marshes on either side of the neck with two artillery pieces, while a small detachment of six men circled behind the guardhouse. On a signal from the forward detachment, the two cannons fired into the house. When the guards ran out, the Colonials fired on them from their positions in the marshes, wounding some and forcing them to retreat toward Boston. The detachment then burned the guardhouse and another structure and captured two muskets and a few other weapons. It is not known whether any of the British soldiers were killed, but no Colonials were killed or wounded.

=== Later history and filling-in of the neck ===
The residents started adding fill along the neck in the late 18th century because the low-lying area was prone to erosion. Beginning in the 1830s, the Charles River tidal flats were filled in with train loads of gravel from the Needham area. This created the present Back Bay section of Boston. The remains of the fortifications at the town gate were still visible in 1822. On July 6, 1824, this section of Orange Street where the town gate once stood was renamed Washington Street.

The Washington Street Elevated (the "El") ran subway trains above Washington Street from 1901 until 1987 when the Orange Line (which inherited the old name of the street) was relocated and the elevated tracks and stations were torn down shortly after the El's April 1987 closure.

The Dover Street station was located at the site of the old town gate at the intersection of Dover and Washington Street. Dover Street was renamed East Berkeley Street sometime after the subway station was demolished. Today, at the intersection of East Berkeley and Washington Streets, nothing of the town gate or the fortifications remains, with the MBTA Silver Line's East Berkeley bus rapid transit station replacing the old Orange Line's Dover elevated station at that location.

== See also ==
- Charlestown Neck
- Dorchester Neck
- Shawmut Peninsula

== Bibliography ==
- Nancy S. Seasholes, Gaining Ground: A History of Landmaking in Boston, The MIT Press (September 28, 2003)
- James Henry Stark’s Antique Views of Boston (1967 reprint) Burdette & Company, Inc. Boston
- David Hackett Fischer, Paul Revere's Ride, Oxford University Press, USA
