= World Trade Center Station =

World Trade Center Station can refer to any of the following:

- Chambers Street–World Trade Center/Park Place/Cortlandt Street station, a station on the IND Eighth Avenue Line in New York City
- WTC Cortlandt station, a station on the IRT Broadway–Seventh Avenue Line in New York City directly under the World Trade Center
- World Trade Center station (PATH), a station in New York City
- World Trade Center station (MBTA), a station on the Silver Line in Boston, Massachusetts
- Taipei 101–World Trade Center metro station, a station on the Tamsui-Xinyi line in Taipei, Taiwan
