= Dover station =

Dover station may refer to:

== United Kingdom ==
- Dover Priory railway station in Dover, Kent, England
- Other railway stations in Dover

== United States ==
- Dover station (MBTA), a former station in Boston, Massachusetts
- Dover station (NJ Transit), a commuter rail station in Dover, New Jersey
- Dover Transportation Center, a railroad station in Dover, New Hampshire
- Dover Plains station, a railroad station in Dover Plains, New York
- Dover station (Minnesota), a station in Dover, Minnesota

== Singapore ==
- Dover MRT station in Dover, Singapore
