= World Trade Center station (MBTA) =

Bus rapid transit station in Boston, Massachusetts, US

World Trade Center
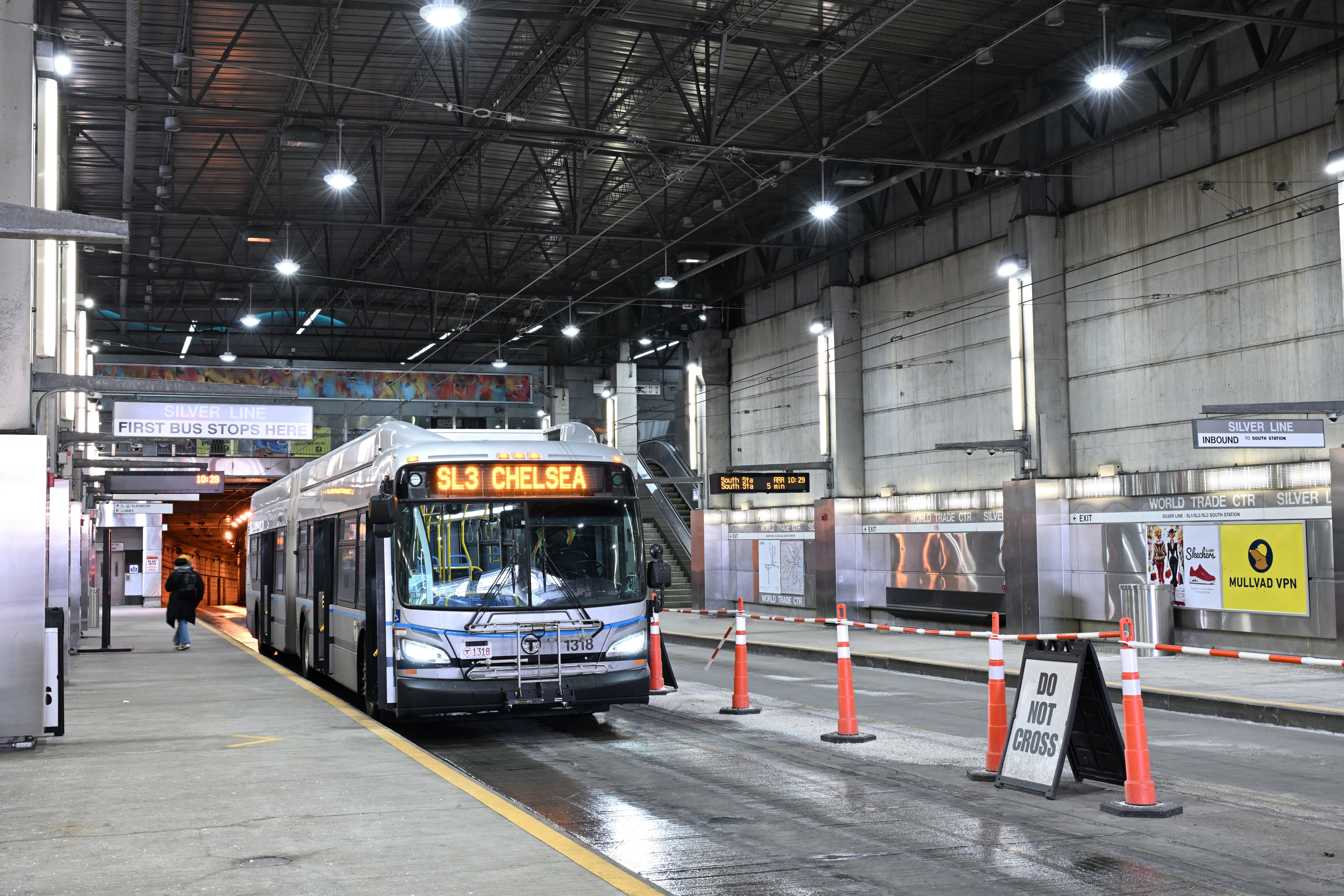
- An outbound route SL3 bus at World Trade Center station in 2025

General information
- Location: Congress Street at World Trade Center Avenue; South Boston, Boston, Massachusetts
- Coordinates: 42°20′53.84″N 71°2′33.23″W
- Line: South Boston Transitway
- Platforms: 2 side platforms

Construction
- Accessible: Yes

History
- Opened: December 17, 2004

Passengers
- FY2019: 1,571 boardings (weekday average)

Services
Preceding station	MBTA	Following station
Courthouse toward South Station	Silver Line SL1	Silver Line Way toward Logan Airport terminals
Courthouse toward South Station	Silver Line SL2	Silver Line Way toward Design Center
Courthouse toward South Station	Silver Line SL3	Silver Line Way toward Chelsea
Courthouse toward South Station	Silver Line SLW	Silver Line Way Terminus
Former services
Preceding station	MBTA	Following station
Courthouse toward South Station	Silver Line SL3 Closed 2009	Silver Line Way toward City Point
Location

World Trade Center station is an underground bus rapid transit station on the MBTA's Silver Line, located south of Congress Street on the South Boston Waterfront. The station is situated between the World Trade Center and the Boston Convention and Exhibition Center; it also serves Commonwealth Pier and nearby residential and commercial development. Like all Silver Line stations, World Trade Center station is accessible.

== History ==
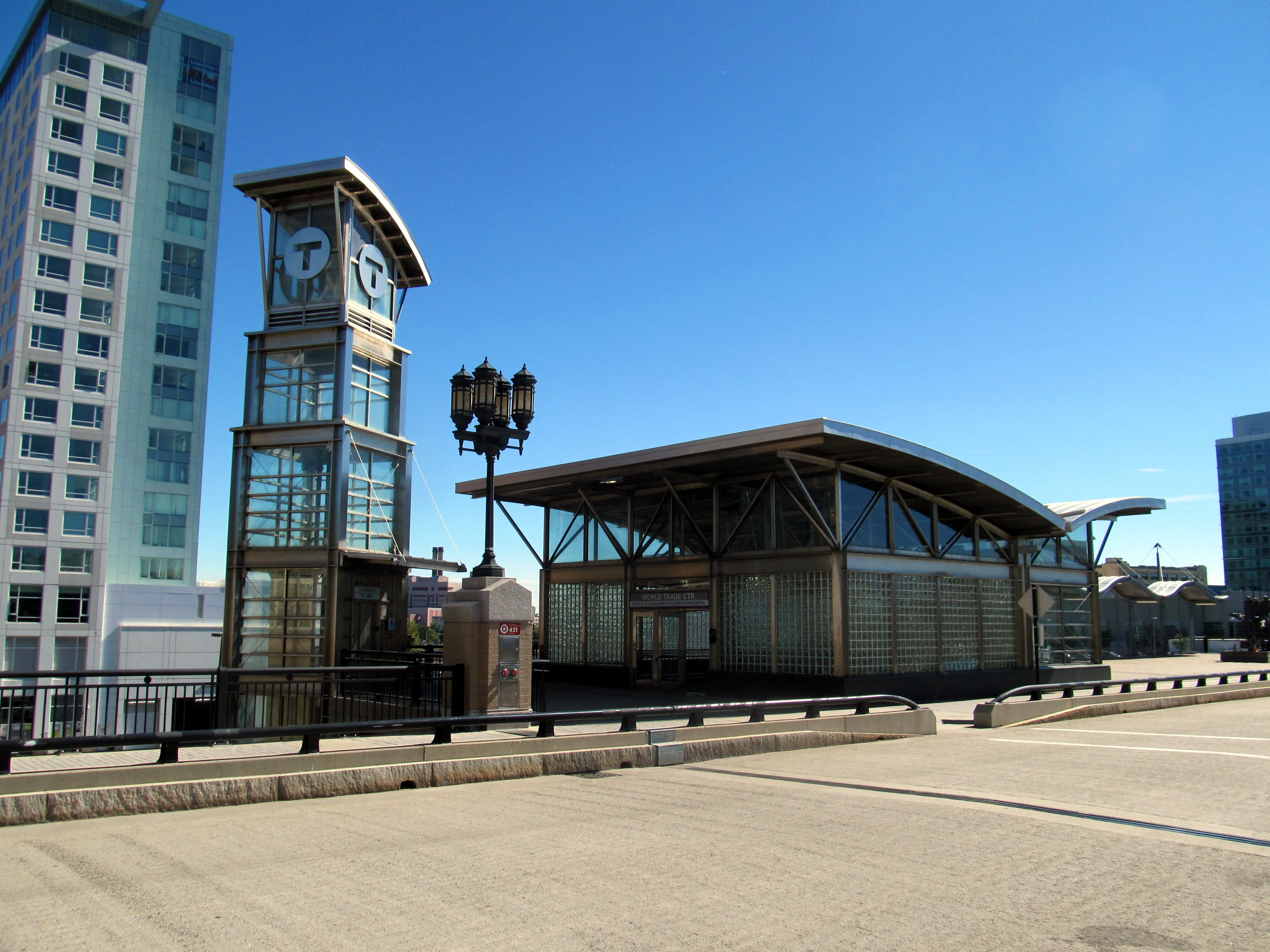
The station headhouse on World Trade Center Avenue

World Trade Center station was designed by G plus G Architects. Its mezzanine level is intended to resemble an underwater environment with a blue-lit wavy ceiling and sand-colored stone tiles with mica flecks. Lenticular art designed by Marybeth Mungovan Lensel and Jason Asselin is installed on the lobby level of the station. The station has entrances from two different street levels: ground-level Congress Street and the elevated World Trade Center Avenue. Because of the configuration of Massachusetts Turnpike exit ramps, inbound SL1 and SL3 buses stop at the station twice: once on Congress Street, then again at the underground platforms after entering the tunnel at Silver Line Way.

World Trade Center station opened along with the rest of the South Boston Piers Transitway from South Station to Silver Line Way on December 17, 2004. Through service on the SL2 and SL3 routes serving the Design Center and City Point areas began on December 31, 2004, followed by SL1 service on June 1, 2005. Inbound SL1 (and since 2018, SL3) buses also stop on Congress Street outside the station before entering the Waterfront Tunnel at Silver Line Way. The original SL3 service was discontinued on March 20, 2009.

The station was a proposed stop on the Urban Ring – a circumferential bus rapid transit (BRT) line designed to connect the existing radial MBTA rail lines to reduce overcrowding in the downtown stations. Under draft plans released in 2008, a surface stop on Congress Street adjacent to the headhouse would have served both northbound and southbound Urban Ring buses. The project was cancelled in 2010.

In early April 2018, construction on a nearby building caused spalling on a concrete column at World Trade Center, closing the station for a day. SL3 service (a new South Station–Chelsea route different from the discontinued City Point route) at the station began on April 21, 2018.
