= Seaport Hotel and Seaport World Trade Center =

Hotel and conference center in Boston, Massachusetts

Coordinates: 42°21′1.0″N 71°2′28.7″W

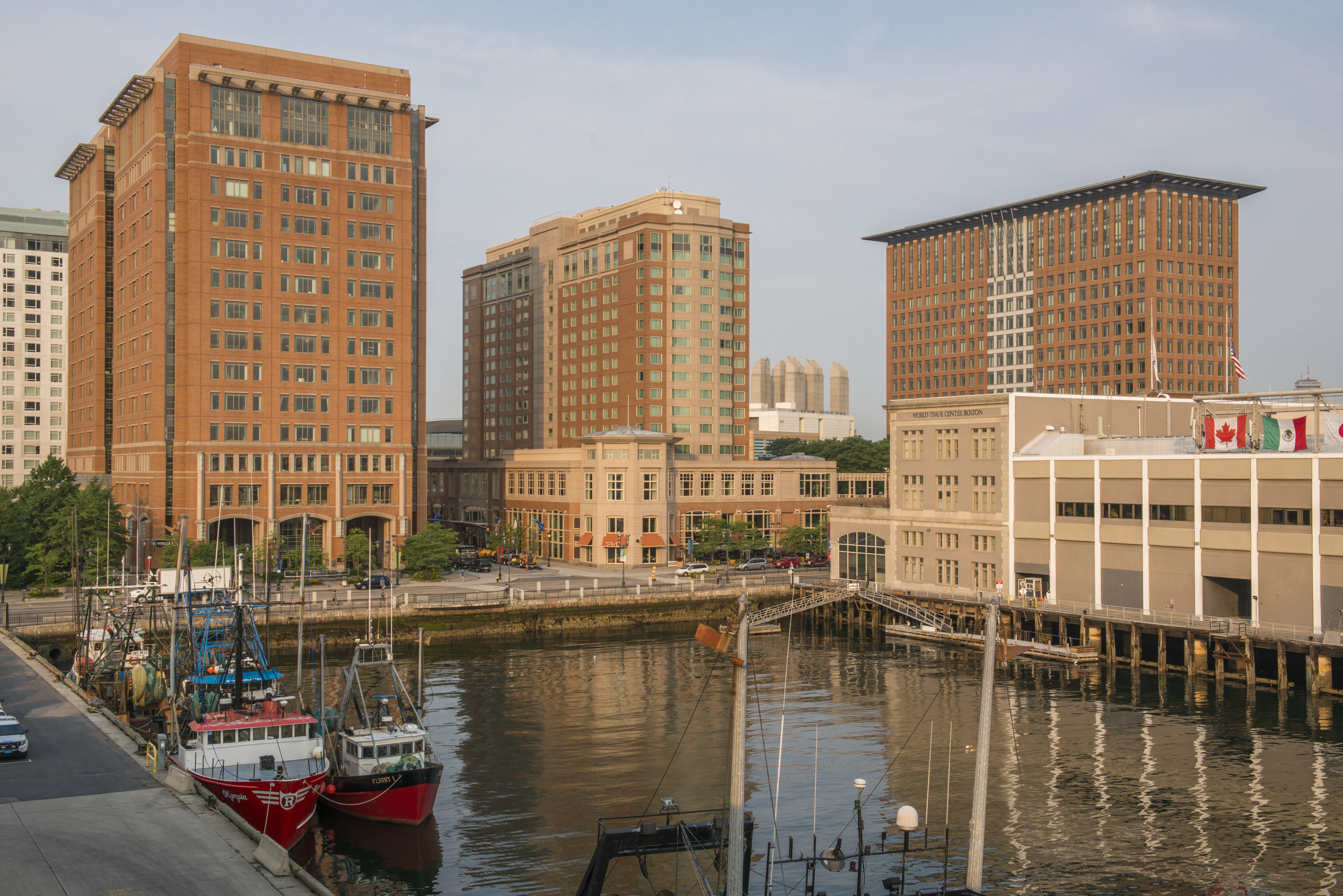
Seaport Boston Hotel and World Trade Center

The Seaport Boston Hotel and World Trade Center is a hotel and conference center complex located on the South Boston Waterfront in Boston, Massachusetts. The South Boston Waterfront is also known as the Boston Seaport District and the Innovation District. The World Trade Center part of the complex is located on Commonwealth Pier.

== History ==
Constructed in 1901 (125 years ago) as a maritime cargo handling facility, Commonwealth Pier was the largest pier building in the world at the time. Able to accommodate the largest vessels that entered the port of Boston, this facility was an integral part of city's maritime industry, handling both freight and passenger traffic, with rail and truck transportation access right on the pier. Commonwealth Pier subsequently underwent two major renovations and continued to host ships through the 1970s, when changes in cargo transport made the pier obsolete. In the early 1980s, the Massachusetts Port Authority designated Fidelity Investments and The Drew Company as developers of Commonwealth Pier, which they transformed into the World Trade Center Boston in 1986. In 1998, Fidelity Investments and The Drew Company opened the Seaport Boston Hotel alongside the World Trade Center.

As of 2024, Commonwealth Pier is under development via the Commonwealth Pier Revitalization Project. When completed, it will house corporate offices and retail space.

== Facilities and features ==
The property has 428 guest rooms and extensive facilities for conferences, meetings and exhibitions with over 180,000 square feet of meeting and event space. The hotel has four restaurants and a health and fitness center, including a swimming pool. Seaport has a 2,300 space underground parking garage and an established environmental program called Seaport Saves.

The hotel contains Hypoallergenic rooms, and Forbes Traveler named Seaport one of "America's Greenest Hotels" in 2008.7 The hotel is also a member of the Green Hotels Association,[8] which promotes environmentally safe products to be used in green hotels and its TAMO Bistro & Bar is a Certified Green Restaurant.

The Center is reached by public transportation via the Silver Line at the World Trade Center station.
