= Jay Coogan =

American artist and an academic

Jay Coogan is an American artist and an academic currently serving as the third President of IYRS School of Technology & Trades. Coogan most recently had served as the sixteenth president of the Minneapolis College of Art and Design (MCAD).

Coogan is a native of Massachusetts. He holds a Bachelor of Arts degree in visual arts from Brown University and a master of fine arts degree in sculpture from Hunter College, the City University of New York. Following completion of his degree at Hunter College, he served as a faculty member, dean, and provost for the Rhode Island School of Design since 1982. He was appointed the president of MCAD from 2009 to 2018.

At the Rhode Island School of Design, Coogan held several positions including: professor of sculpture, dean of fine arts, and provost. He also received praise from the president of RISD who claimed he was one of the most valuable contributors to that school. Coogan's main focus coming into the MCAD as the new president was to "strengthen the College's regional connections, building new partnerships, and elevating MCAD's reputation as a leader in discovering and developing creative talent".

Jay was President of the IYRS School of Technology & Trades in Newport, Rhode Island from 2018 to 2023. IYRS has its roots in yacht restoration—its original name was the International Yacht Restoration School—but since its founding in 1993, it has expanded to include programs in marine systems, composites technology, and digital modeling and fabrication. The breadth of the IYRS program shows in the range of projects its graduates are pursuing.

Aside from his administrative work Coogan creates sculpture, drawings, paintings and functional works. Coogan's sculptural objects, installations, and functional works have been shown in solo shows at the Monique Knowlton Gallery, Helander Gallery and Hal Bromm Gallery in New York. He has had work shown at the Fort Worth Art Museum, Chrysler Museum, Queens Museum, Nassau County Museum, and the Jacksonville Art Museum. His public commissions include works for the cities Cambridge, Boston, Providence, and Green Bay.

Coogan had his first solo art show in New York in 1982, at the Monique Knowlton Gallery, where he worked between painting and sculpture using wood, aluminum, and steel. Coogan discusses his inspirations for creating his shapes in sculpting, which include "Canal Street stores, grocery stores, anthropological museums and objects found on the beach." The New York Times wrote an article about Coogan's artwork in 1982, discussing his art.
