= Dover station (MBTA) =

Former rapid transit station in Boston, Massachusetts, US

Dover
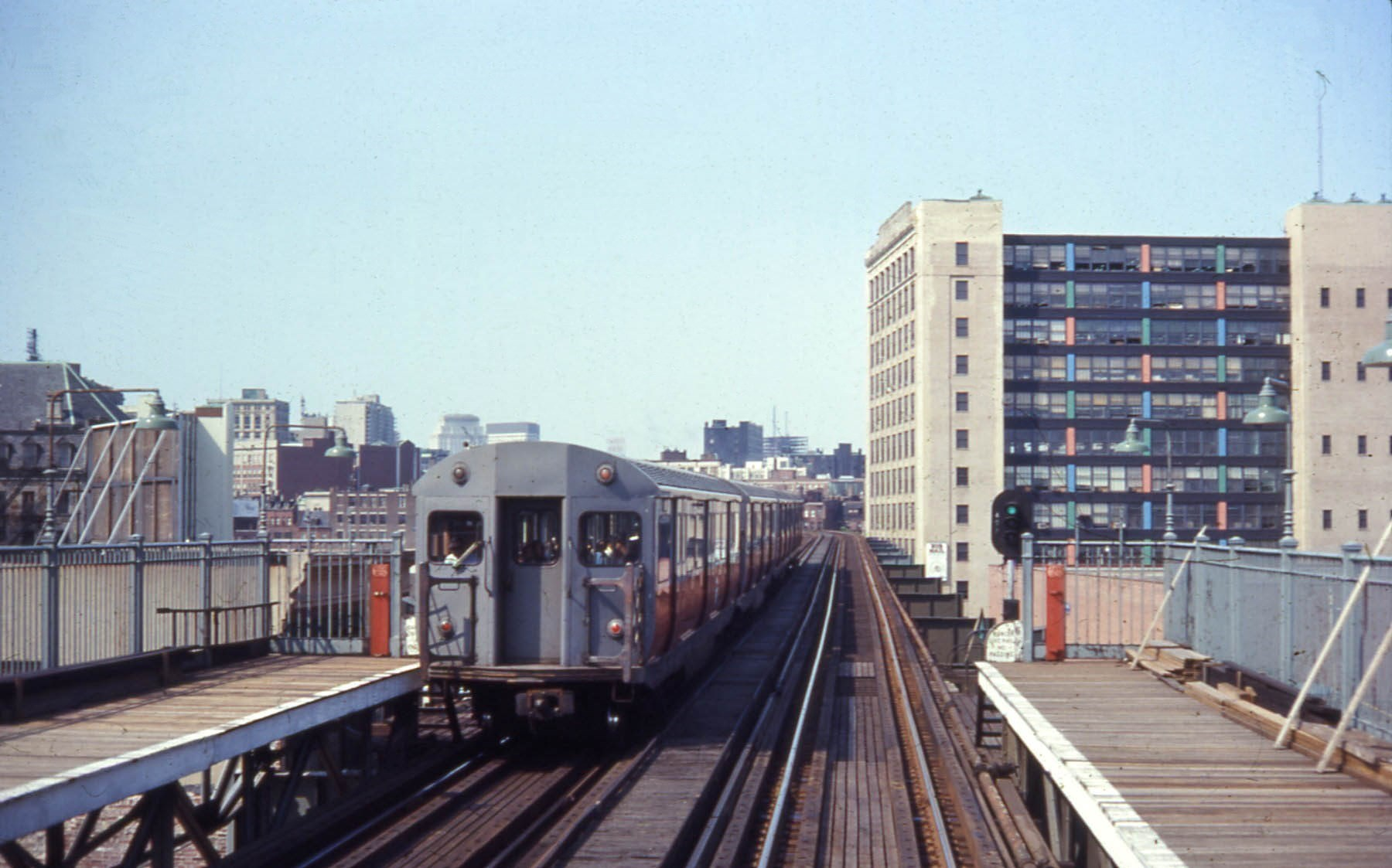
- A train approaching Dover station in 1967

General information
- Location: Washington Street at Dover Street; Boston, Massachusetts
- Coordinates: 42°20′38.22″N 71°3′57.59″W
- Line: Washington Street Elevated
- Platforms: 2 side platforms
- Tracks: 2
- Connections: MBTA bus: 9, 11

Construction
- Cycle facilities: 2 spaces (Silver Line)
- Accessible: Yes (Silver Line)

History
- Opened: June 10, 1901; July 20, 2002 (Silver Line)
- Closed: April 30, 1987
- Rebuilt: December 9, 1912

Passengers
- 2012: 1,374 (average weekday boardings - Silver Line)

Services
Preceding station	MBTA	Following station
Union Park Street toward Nubian	Silver Line SL4	Herald Street toward South Station
Union Park Street toward Nubian	Silver Line SL5	Herald Street toward Downtown Crossing

Former services
Preceding station	MBTA	Following station
Northampton toward Forest Hills	Orange Line	Essex toward Oak Grove
Location

Dover station was an elevated rapid transit station located above Washington Street at Dover Street (now East Berkeley Street) in the South End neighborhood of Boston, Massachusetts. It served the Washington Street Elevated, part of the MBTA's Orange Line, from 1901 until 1987.

East Berkeley Street station, a street-level bus station on the Washington Street branch of the MBTA Silver Line bus rapid transit service, opened on the site in 2002. It is served by the SL4 and SL5 Silver Line routes as well as several local MBTA bus routes. Like all Silver Line stops, East Berkeley Street is accessible.

== History ==
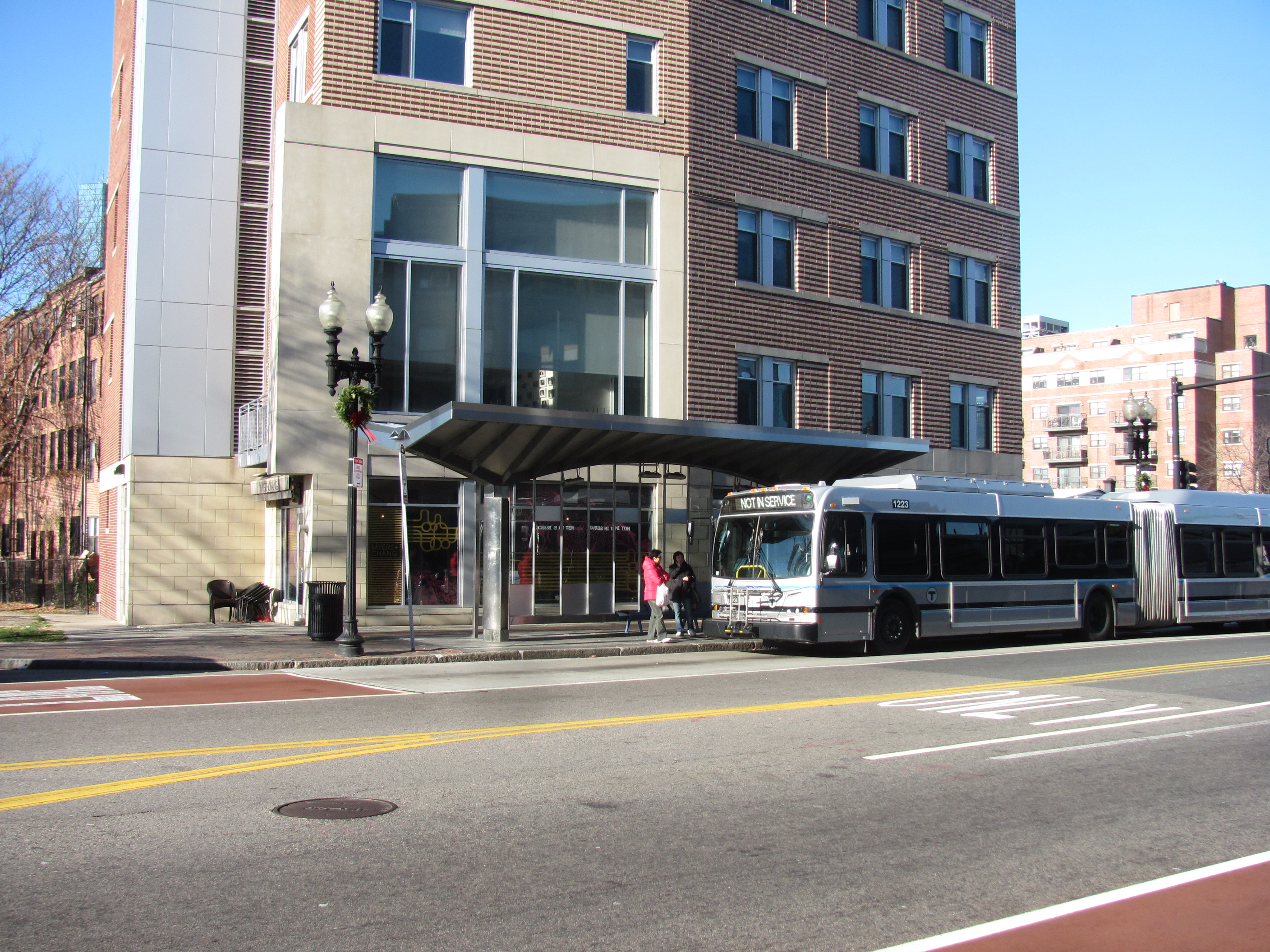
A southbound Silver Line bus at East Berkeley Street in 2011

The Washington Street Elevated, including Dover station, opened as part of the Main Line Elevated on June 10, 1901. It was originally built with a short center island platform, similar to Northampton station to the south. Like most of the other Elevated stations, both were designed in a Beaux Arts style by Alexander Wadsworth Longfellow Jr. Mere months after opening, both stations had their platforms extended for four-car trains. Eleven years later, Dover was rebuilt with two eight-car-long side platforms in a more utilitarian style, with the new station opening on December 9, 1912. A temporary wooden station was used during construction.

On December 5, 1960, the MTA began operating "modified express service" on the Elevated during the morning rush hour. Every other train bypassed Dover and three other stations. This was discontinued in September 1961 to reduce wait times at the skipped stations, all of which were outdoors.

The Main Line Elevated was renamed the Orange Line in 1965. Dover station was closed on April 30, 1987, when the Washington Street Elevated was closed and the Orange Line was rerouted to the west along the Southwest Corridor. Silver Line service on Washington Street began on July 20, 2002, replacing the route 49 bus. Service levels increased on October 15, 2009, with the introduction of the SL4 route.
