= South Station (subway) =

Subway station in Boston, Massachusetts, US

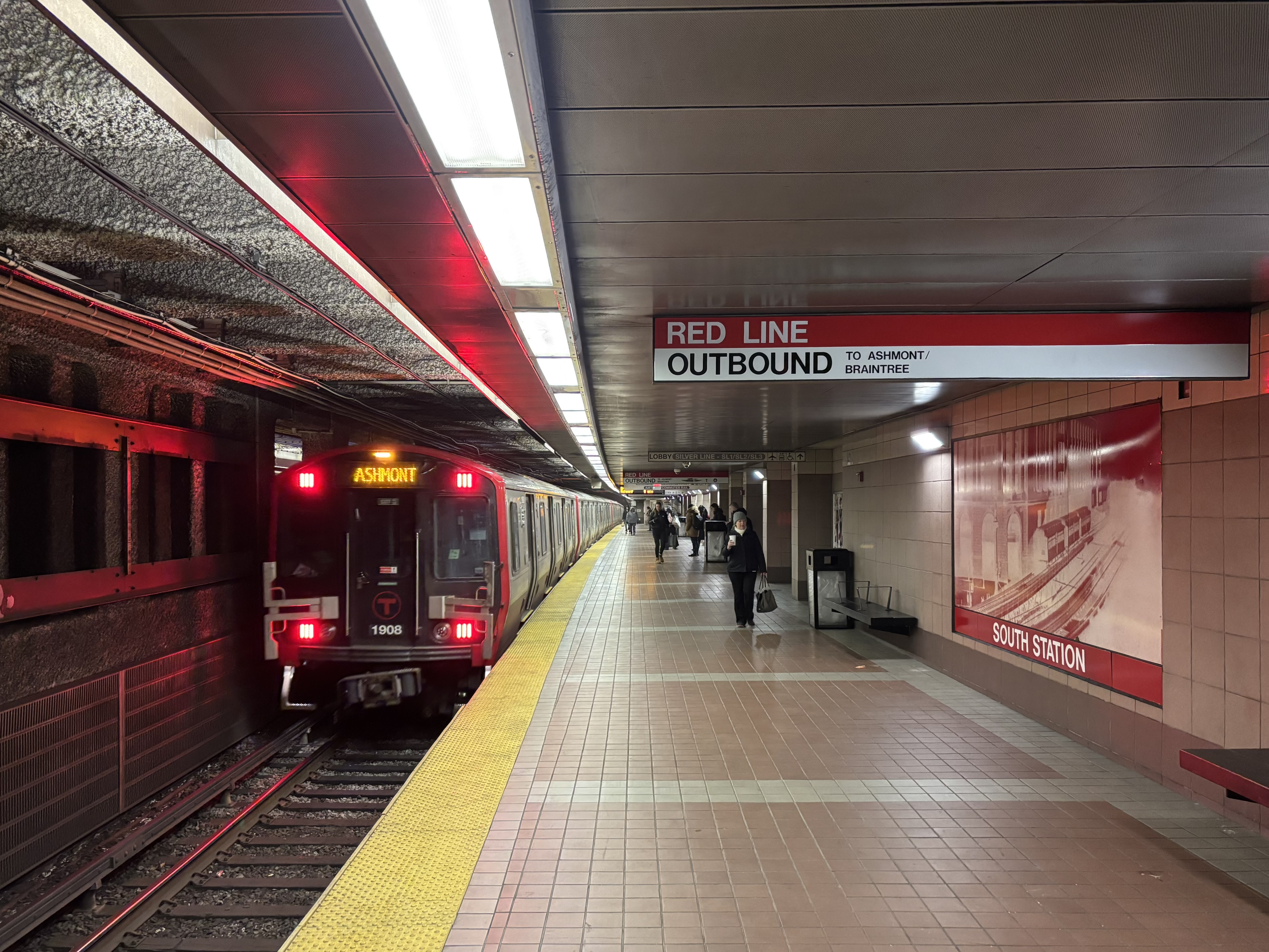
- A southbound Red Line train departing South Station in 2025

General information
- Other names: South Station Under
- Location: Atlantic Avenue and Summer Street; Boston, Massachusetts
- Coordinates: 42.35261°N 71.05536°W
- Lines: Cambridge-Dorchester Tunnel (Red Line); South Boston Transitway (Silver Line)
- Platforms: 2 side platforms (Red Line); 2 side platforms (Silver Line tunnel); 1 side platform (Silver Line street)
- Tracks: 2 (Red Line)
- Connections: MBTA bus: 4, 7, 11; MBTA Commuter Rail and Amtrak at South Station; Intercity buses at South Station Bus Terminal

Construction
- Structure type: Underground
- Cycle facilities: "Pedal and Park" bicycle cage
- Accessible: Yes

History
- Opened: August 22, 1901 (Atlantic Avenue Elevated); December 3, 1916 (Red Line); December 17, 2004 (Silver Line)
- Closed: September 30, 1938 (Atlantic Avenue Elevated)
- Rebuilt: 1980s–1993, 2002–2004

Passengers
- FY2019: 24,639 (weekday average boardings)

Services
| Preceding station | MBTA | Following station |
|---|---|---|
| Downtown Crossing toward Alewife | Red Line | Broadway toward Ashmont or Braintree |
| Terminus | Silver Line SL1 | Courthouse toward Logan Airport terminals |
| Terminus | Silver Line SL2 | Courthouse toward Design Center |
| Terminus | Silver Line SL3 | Courthouse toward Chelsea |
| Chinatown One-way operation | Silver Line SL4 (at surface stop) | Terminus |
| Chinatown Gate toward Nubian | Silver Line SL4 (at surface stop) | Terminus |
Former services
| Preceding station | MBTA | Following station |
|---|---|---|
| Terminus | Silver Line SL3 Closed 2009 | Courthouse toward City Point |
| Preceding station | Boston Elevated Railway | Following station |
| Terminus | Atlantic Avenue Elevated Closed 1938 | Rowes Wharf toward North Station |
| Dover toward Dudley | Atlantic Avenue Elevated Rush hours only Closed 1938 | Rowes Wharf toward North Station |
Track layout
- Streets, I-93, and SL4 are omitted For the commuter rail and Amtrak station, see
Location

South Station (also signed as South Station Under) is a transfer station on the MBTA rapid transit Red Line and bus rapid transit Silver Line, located at Summer Street and Atlantic Avenue in downtown Boston, Massachusetts. It is a part of the complex of the same name, the second busiest transportation center in New England. Eight MBTA Commuter Rail and three Amtrak intercity rail services terminate at South Station; many of those passengers then transfer to the rapid transit lines to reach other destinations in the city. With 24,639 daily boardings in 2019, South Station is the busiest station on the MBTA rapid transit system.

== Station layout ==
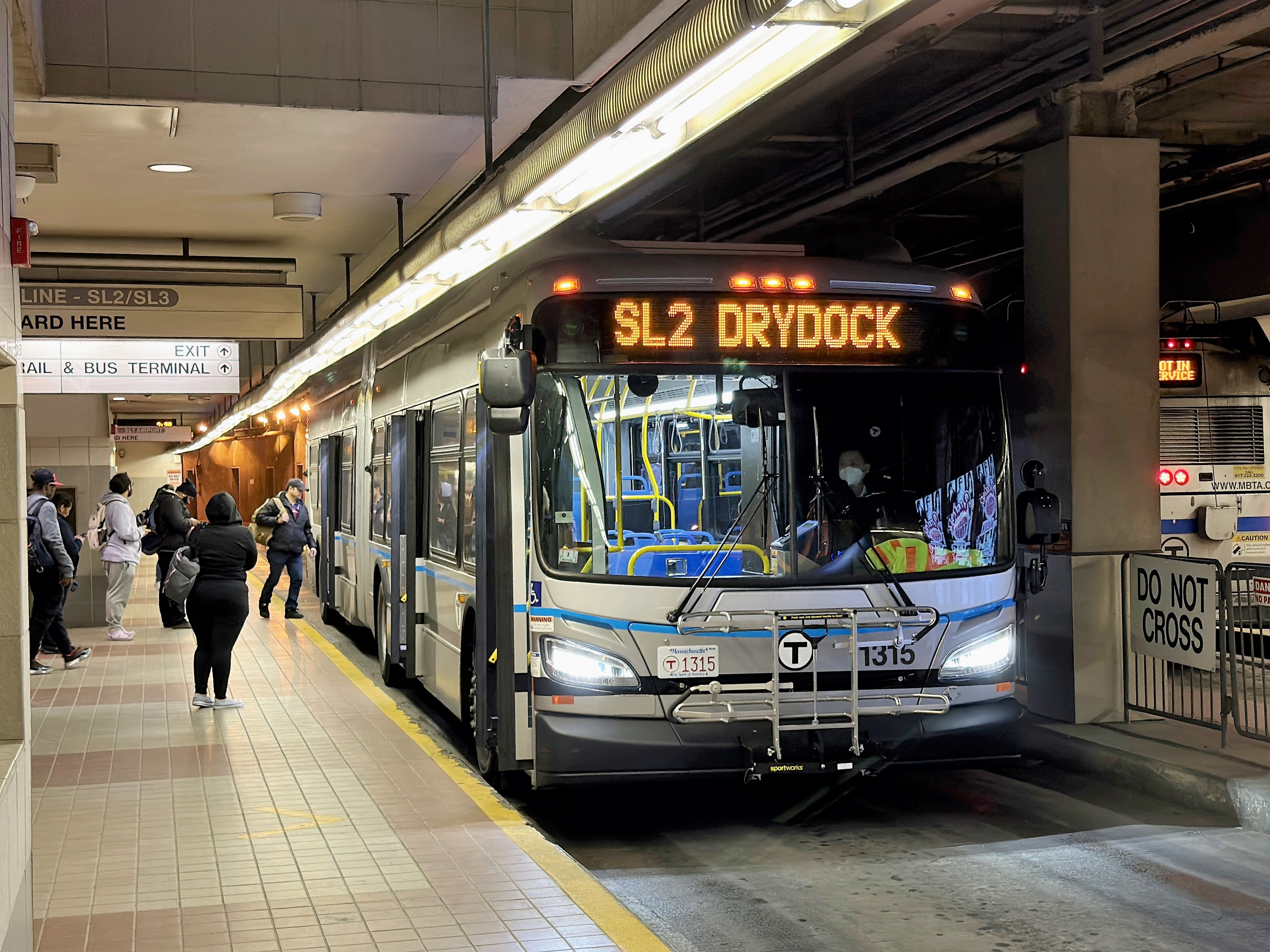
A Silver Line bus at South Station in 2023

South Station has three underground levels. The Red Line runs under Summer Street at the lowest level, with two side platforms serving the line's two tracks. The Silver Line runs under Atlantic Avenue on the middle level, with two side platforms serving the busway. A fare mezzanine is just below street level, with stairs, escalators, and elevators to the platforms below. It has entrances at street level on all four corners of the intersection of Summer Street and Atlantic Avenue, with elevators at the north and south corners. An accessible passage also connects the mezzanine with the interior of the South Station terminal, served by Amtrak and MBTA Commuter Rail trains.

Silver Line route SL4 runs on the surface rather than the underground busway; it stops on Essex Street at Atlantic Avenue. MBTA bus routes 4, 7, and 11 stop on Summer Street near Atlantic Avenue. South Station Bus Terminal, the main intercity bus terminal in Boston, is located over the South Station platforms.

== History ==
=== Red Line and Atlantic Avenue Elevated ===
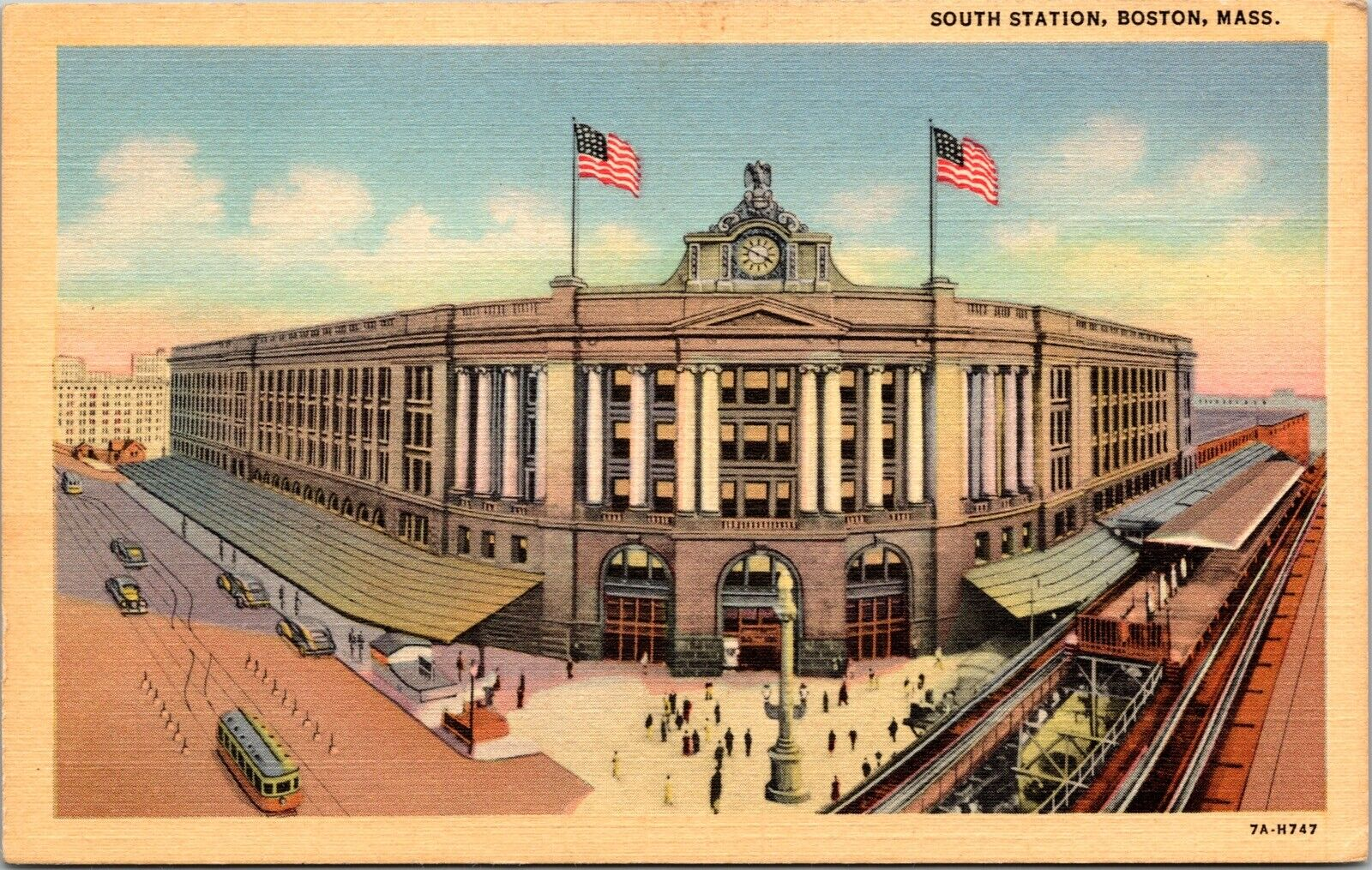
In this 1930s view, the Atlantic Avenue Elevated passes in front of South Station with the elevated station at right

The Atlantic Avenue Elevated opened on August 22, 1901, with an elevated station over Atlantic Avenue next to South Station. The Cambridge Tunnel was extended one stop from Washington to South Station Under on December 3, 1916. It was the terminal under a further extension to Broadway in 1917. The underground station had four staircases and one escalator leading from the surface to the mezzanine, and two exit escalators. There was not initially a direct connection between the subway and elevated stations; passengers had to use a paper transfer and go outside to change trains. Service on the Atlantic Avenue Elevated was discontinued on September 20, 1938. The structure itself was torn down in the spring of 1942.

In 1957, the original fare lobby and the rounded top of the tunnel to the west were removed during construction of the Dewey Square Tunnel. The tunnel was rebuilt with a flat ceiling, while the fare lobby was moved to the east closer to the South Station headhouse. The Cambridge–Dorchester Line became the Red Line in 1967. In the 1970s, an artwork by Sylvana Cenci entitled Wheels in Motion was placed in the station. Cenci created the artwork by using explosives to warp a steel plate. She had previously been runner-up in a 1971 competition for public art at State station.

A second renovation began around 1980. An entrance was also added to the Federal Reserve Bank Building as well as a passageway under Summer Street connecting the other street entrances. In 1985, the Red Line platforms were extended 60 feet on either end to allow 6-car trains. A passageway between the Red Line lobby and the interior of South Station opened in June 1990.

=== Silver Line ===
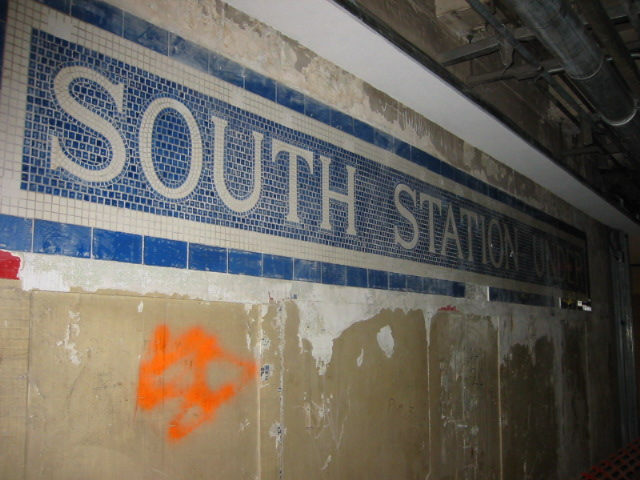
Tile mosaic being restored in 2005

The final renovation was triggered by the Big Dig highway project. Since the Red Line tunnel beneath Summer Street is perpendicular to Atlantic Avenue, where the new I-93 northbound tunnel was to be built, builders had to tunnel under the tracks. After the first tunnel was complete, another tunnel was added along with a station for the Silver Line. Since the new tunnel was built at the former fare level, another fare level was constructed a level above. This allowed combined access for the Silver and Red lines. The original lobby that was destroyed was replaced by stairways. This project was completed at a cost of $35 million. An additional $13 million renovation of the Red Line level was undertaken.

After the first sections of the Silver Line opened in 2002 and 2004, a Phase III was proposed which would build a tunnel connecting South Station and the South Boston Waterfront section with the Washington Street section of the line. In 2010, the project was placed on indefinite hold. However, route SL4, operating to a surface stop on Essex Street at Atlantic Avenue, began service on October 13, 2009.

In early 2005, a blue and white tile mosaic reading 'South Station Under' was discovered during renovations to the Red Line platform. The MBTA had the mosaic restored to its original condition during the project. Network, a 650-square-foot (60 m^{2}) glass mosaic map by Ellen Harvey, was built on the interior walls of the northeast headhouse in 2019.

South Station was one of ten high-ridership subway stations planned to receive new wayfinding signage, lighting, and other station improvements in 2019. Six of these stations received these improvements in 2019 and 2020; designs were completed for South Station and three others, but they were not constructed due to a lack of available funding.
