= City Point Bus Terminal =

Bus station in South Boston, Massachusetts, US

City Point
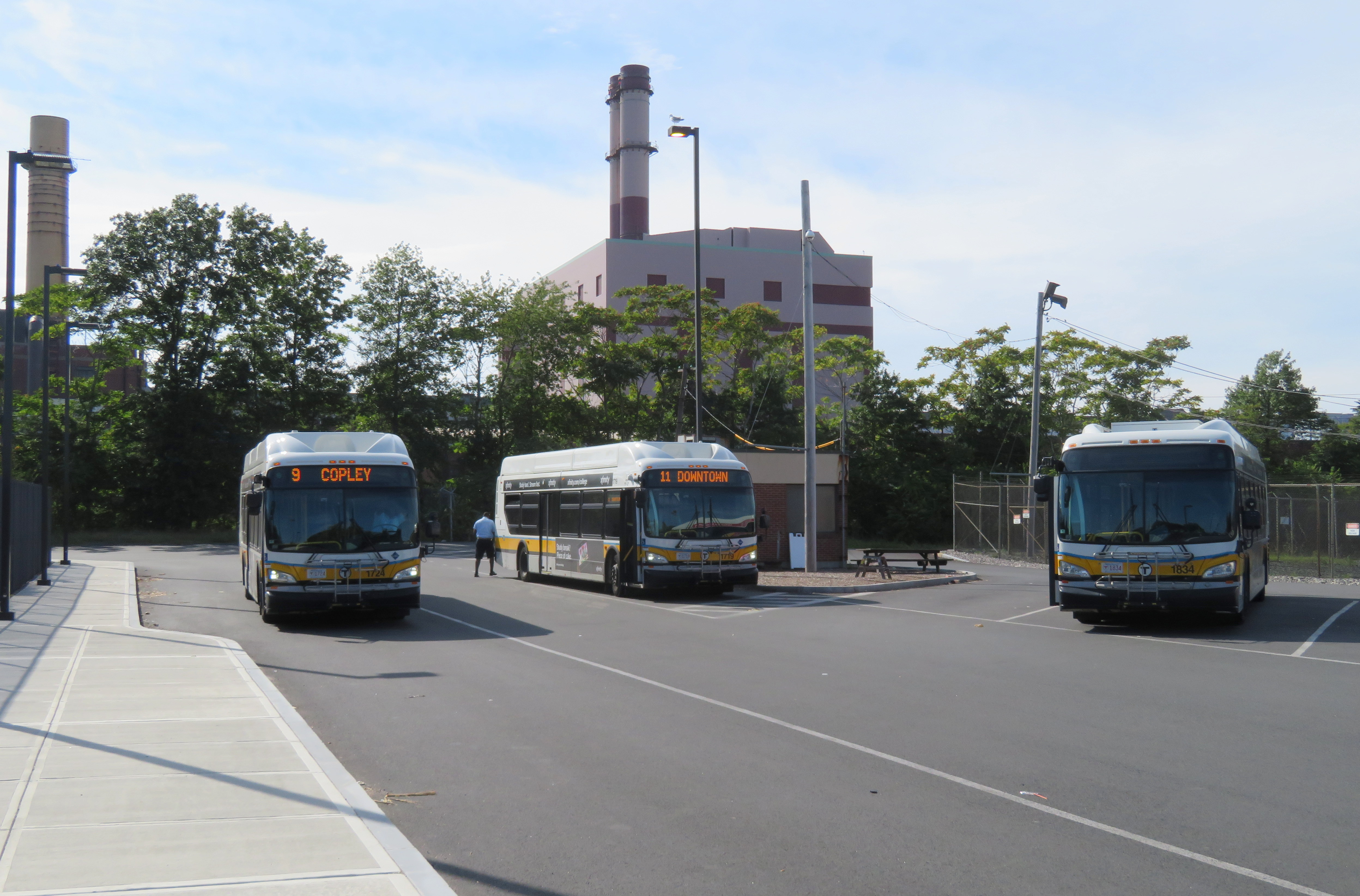
- MBTA buses at City Point Bus Terminal in 2018

General information
- Location: East 1st Street at N Street; South Boston, Massachusetts
- Coordinates: 42.33855°N 71.03146°W
- Connections: MBTA bus: 7, 9, 10, 11

History
- Opened: December 31, 2004 (Silver Line)
- Closed: 1953 (streetcar lines); March 20, 2009 (Silver Line)
- Rebuilt: 2017

Former services
Preceding station	MBTA	Following station
East 1st Street & M Street toward South Station	Silver Line SL3 Closed 2009	Terminus
Location

City Point Bus Terminal is a bus station in South Boston, Massachusetts. It serves MBTA bus routes 7, 9, 10 and 11. From 2004 to 2009, it was the terminus of Silver Line route SL3.

== History ==
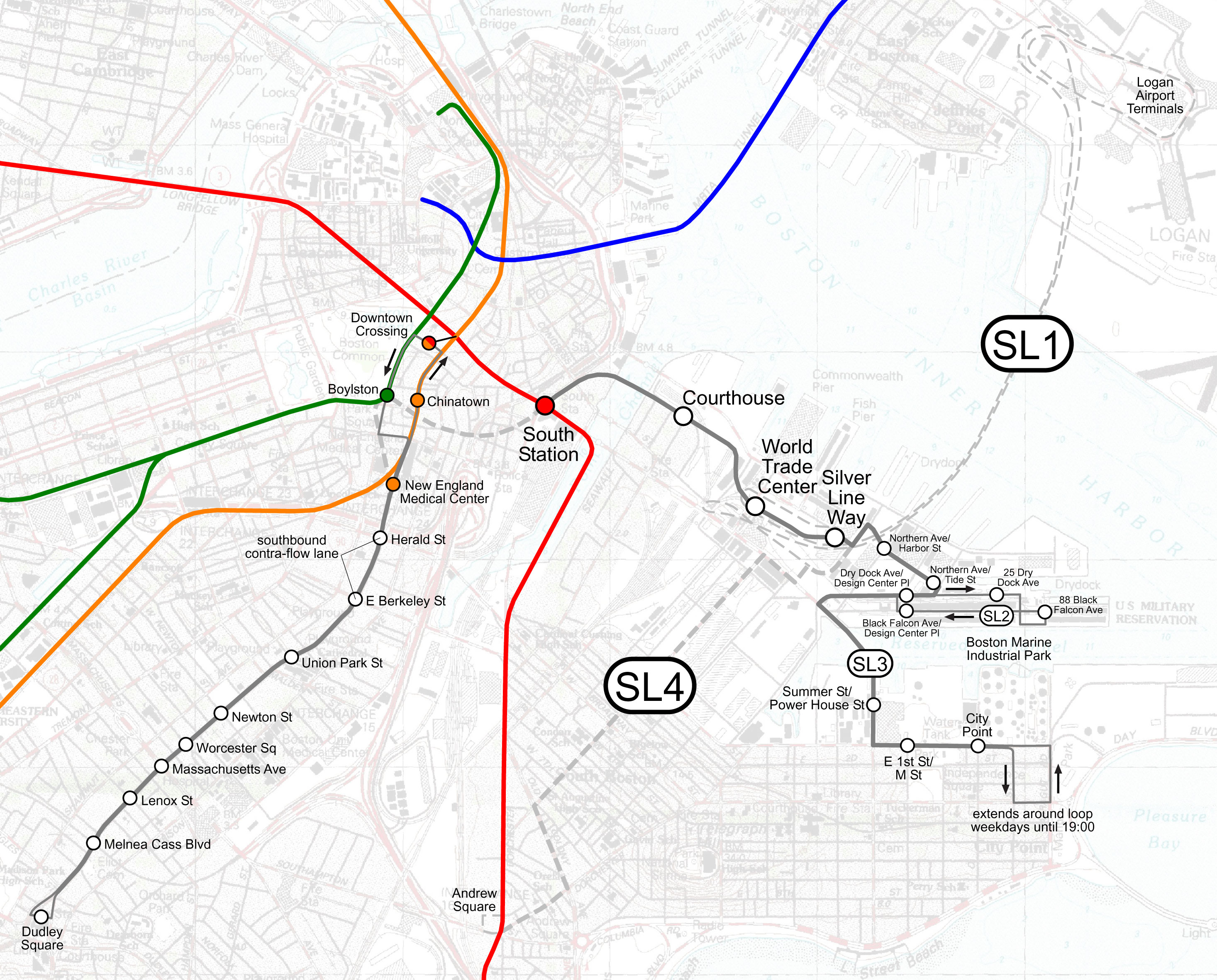
Old geographic map of the Silver Line, showing the SL3 (lower right). The SL4 route shown never ran; the current SL4 shares most of its route with the SL5.

The City Point area is served by the route 7, 9, 10 and 11 buses, all of which terminate at City Point Bus Terminal on East 1st Street between M and N streets. All were formerly streetcar routes. Service was converted to bus on routes 7, 9, and 10 in 1953; they were some of the last Boston-area streetcar lines to be bustituted, and route 9 was one of the last two lines to serve the Pleasant Street incline. Streetcars last ran on route 11 in 1929. Until October 1985, when the modern turnaround loop was built, service ran to the former carhouse location at East 2nd Street and O Street.

SL3 (South Station–City Point) Silver Line service began on December 17, 2004. City Point served as the terminal except for April 9 to August 20, 2005, when weekday daytime service was extended to Farragut Road. SL3 service ended on March 20, 2009.

Until 2017, the off-street loop at City Point was only used for layovers; passengers waited at ordinary sidewalk stops. In May 2017, the MBTA announced plans to convert the layover facility to a passenger terminal with a platform, shelters, and seating. The renovation was completed in September 2017.
