= John Shepperd =

John Shepperd may refer to:

- John Shepperd (actor) (1907–1983), American performer, also billed as Shepperd Strudwick
- John Ben Shepperd (1915–1990), American lawyer, businessman and politician
- John Shepperd (cricketer) (1937–2020), English right-handed batsman and umpire

== See also ==
- John Shepherd (disambiguation)
- John Sheppard (disambiguation)
