= John Sheppard =

John Sheppard may refer to:

== Law and politics ==
- John Calhoun Sheppard (1850–1931), American politician, governor of South Carolina
- John L. Sheppard (1852–1902), American lawyer, judge, and legislator, U.S. representative for Texas
- John Morris Sheppard (1875–1941), U.S. representative and senator for Texas
- John Albert Sheppard (1875–?), Canadian educator, farmer and political figure in Saskatchewan
- John Sheppard (Australian politician) (born 1952), Australian politician

== Military ==
- John Sheppard (North Carolina) (c.1750–c.1790), American Revolutionary War soldier and commander of the North Carolina militia
- John Sheppard (VC) (1817–1884), English recipient of the Victoria Cross
- John Sheppard (British Army soldier) (1915–2015)

== Sports ==
- John Sheppard (cricketer) (1824–1882), English cricketer
- John Sheppard (baseball) (fl. 1870s), American baseball player
- Johnny Sheppard (1902–1969), Canadian ice hockey forward

== Other ==
- John Sheppard (composer) (c. 1515–1558), English singer and composer
- John Sheppard (writer) (1785–1879), English lay religious author
- John Augustine Sheppard (1849–1925), Irish American clergyman
- Sir John Tresidder Sheppard (1881–1968), British classicist
- John Sheppard (car designer) (1922–2015), British car designer
- John Sheppard, member of English band Acoustic Alchemy
- Jack Sheppard (John Sheppard, 1702–1724), English criminal
- Jack Sheppard (cave diver) (John Arthur Sheppard, 1909–2001), cave diving pioneer in the United Kingdom

== Fiction ==
- John Sheppard (Stargate), fictional character from Stargate Atlantis

== See also ==
- John Shepard III (1886–1950), American radio executive and merchant, owner of the Shepard Department Store in Boston, MA
- Jack Sheppard (disambiguation)
- Commander Shepard, playable character from Mass Effect; default name is John Shepard
- John Shepherd (disambiguation)
