= Sheppard family (clothiers) =

Industrialist in Frome, Somerset

The Sheppard family dominated cloth manufacture in Frome, Somerset, England. They were the first to introduce machinery into the area and in the first quarter of the 19th century were the largest employers.

First names of the Sheppard family occur again and again down the centuries: John, Edward, William, Thomas, Eleanor, Walter, George.

In the town their name is attached to three places: the Emma Sheppard Centre for dementia day care, Sheppards Barton where there is a plaque at the south end of the barton and Network Rail's Sheppards Overbridge on the lane leading to Garston Farm once owned by them.

== John Sheppard (c1614-1675) founder of the family ==
John was the first of his surname to be directly associated with the cloth industry in Frome. There were earlier Sheppards in Frome, renting land in the 16th century on Rodden Down, but no pedigree can be established. His trade was as a cardboard maker - making boards for carding wool. Spinners prepared the wool by combing it. Wire drawers were needed to make the pins which formed the comb. Until the eighteenth century this was done by hand, combing the raw unwashed wool with a card in each hand at right angles to one another. The business was not just local; the cards were sold across the country.

John leased property on Catherine Hill from Champneys of Orchardleigh; this relationship with the Orchardleigh squires continued for two hundred years; this was probably 13 Catherine Hill and included houses, buildings, stables, orchards and a meadows nearby. Later he bought land directly from Champneys' widow; this is now part of Wine Street. He built what is now 21 Wine Street in 1650; it remained in the Sheppard family until 1847 when John, his grandson four times removed gave it to the Sheppards Barton Baptist Church. He purchased land in Nunney. These substantial leases and purchases suggest his business was flourishing.

The Sheppards were Baptists. Yet in 1675, just before his death, he leased some of his land on a 1,000 years lease to the Quakers for their first meeting house in Frome. One of his sons, Benjamin continued in the carding trade. His eldest, John is described as a clothier, a merchant in his own right. John's second son, Edward (1649-1686) was a maltster. He had three children by his second wife, who had three children of her own; they died within a month of each other in 1686. His brothers became responsible for bringing up the orphans.

== John Sheppard (c1680-1720) clothier ==
Edward's eldest son, John, who as a minor inherited most of his father's property, became a cloth merchant in turn. In 1705 he married Philippa Humphrey of Berkley by whom he had six children. He renewed the lease on the Catherine Hill properties. He purchased more land at Critchill and leased further land to the Quakers. He built tenements on his land as well as being a substantial subscriber to the costs of building Sheppards Barton Baptist Church of 1707. There is a tradition that before the completion Baptists met in his house at No 13 Catherine Hill (beside the steps coming down from Sheppards Barton). He was a signatory to the successful Petition of 1713, in which Frome and other cloth towns protested about changes in duty brought about by the Peace of Utrecht that would have given French clothiers the edge. He died in 1720, leaving the greatest part of his property to his wife and four trustees to manage in trust for his eldest son, William. £700 was given to his eldest, then aged 11, provided the freehold of Sheppards Barton Church was handed over to trustees.

His widow effectively managed the family's business. She purchased what is now 30 Catherine Hill, next to the Baptist Burial Ground and lived there. She bought land and a dyehouse. She died in 1750, distributing through her will money and effects among her children and grandchildren.

== William Sheppard (1709-1759) ==
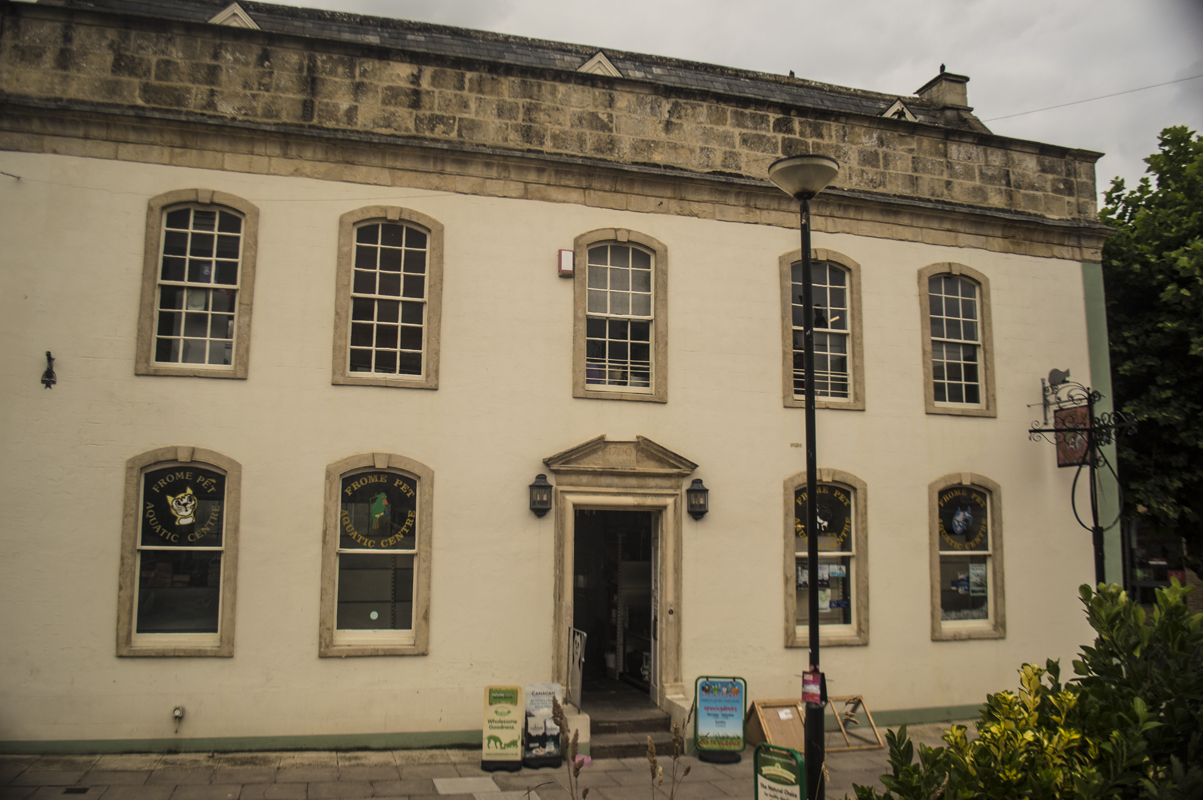
Listed II building in Frome, circa 1700, named 'Iron Gates'

John's eldest son, William was a clothier like his father. He was born in Catherine's Hill. With his wife, Eleanor, he had ten children. half of whom who survived into the 19th century at the height of their family's prosperity. These were William (1735-1814), Walter (1739-1810), Henry (1744-1811), John (1747-1806) and Edward (1741-1808). Of these only William and Edward had children. On his death he was buried in Sheppard's Barton.

By 1785 Eleanor was living with her son Walter at Iron Gates in King Street. She died 33 years after her husband in 1792.

William continued to expand the family's properties: building plots in what became High Street, Wine Street and South Parade, and land in Dyers Close. In the 1730s he built houses in High Street and Wine Street (note: High Street was named as it lay on the high ground next to Catherine Hill, not to be confused with a street of shops in modern usage); these were all built on land purchased by John Shepherd in 1650. By 1755 he had built 19 houses in High Street, bequeathing the eastern side to his son Henry and the western side to his son Edward. His sons established factories at Rodden, Willow Vale and Spring Gardens.

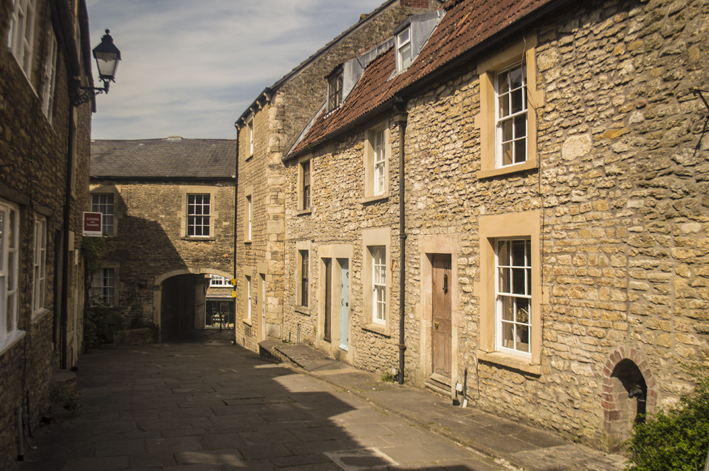
18th century houses in Sheppard's Barton

== Sheppard's Barton ==
By the 1760s, a number of cottages had been built to house weavers on land first leased to John Sheppard (c1614-1675) by the Champneys, part of his Catherine Hill complex.

The word Barton derives from Old English bere (barley) and ton (enclosure) and is connected to Demesne, land belonging to the Lord of the manor. In the West Country, Bartons are frequently found, associated with farms in the main. In towns they may refer to small thoroughfares, often not wide enough to allow carts to pass through, a narrow lane. In Frome there are many examples: Plumbers Barton, Clavey's Barton (now Blindhouse Lane), Humphries Barton (now South Parade); the name has been applied to modern streets: Foundry Barton, Leonards Barton. Nearby Mells is transversed across its centre by a number of similar bartons.

== William Sheppard (1735-1814) ==
The first son of William and Eleanor, He was married to Anne Hulbert (1737-1820) in 1762. They had eight children: William Hulbert (1762-1804), Edward (1764-1849), Thomas (1766-1858), Anne (1768-1861), Elizabeth (1769-1841), Henry (1770-1854), George (1773-1855) and Eleanor (1777-1862).

The Sheppards Barton Meeting House of the Quakers was replaced by a new building in 1783, the quit rent still being paid to the Sheppards.

His brother Edward, the last son of William and Eleanor, married Elizabeth Harmer in 1777, by whom he had two children: Thomas Harmer (1778-1860) and Mary Harmer (1790-1840).

== Frome's first MP ==
Thomas Sheppard (1766-1858) was the third son of William Sheppard. In 1800 in Friern Barnet, London he married Sarah Down (1775-1844). They had six children: Thomas (1802–51), Charles Down (1805–61), Walter Cope (1806–61), Sarah Frances (1808-post-1882), Susan (1810–96) and Frederick (1812–75).

Politically he was a radical and a Whig who was elected as Frome's first MP in 1832. The story of that riotous election may be found here. He was the only representative in the House of Commons who had a pigtail.

Like his election nominator, Thomas Bunn, Sheppard supported the Anti-Slavery movement and was a delegate for Frome at the British and Foreign Anti-Slavery Convention, at the Freemason's Hall, London, on 12 June 1834.

Once elected, he spent much of his time in London, living in either The Lawn, Hampstead or in the city at Basinghall Street. In 1838 Thomas bought the Folkington and Wootton manors in the South Downs and built for himself a new Folkington Manor, designed by the architect William Donthorn. After the death of his son Frederick in 1875, it was sold to another family.

== George Sheppard (1773-1855) captain of industry ==
George was the youngest son of William Sheppard and became the major clothier in Frome. He married Mary Ann Stuart Byard (1777-1838), daughter of Captain Sir Thomas Byard. They had four sons: Thomas Byard, George Wood (1807-1894), Walter (1809-1852) and Alfred Byard (1810-post-1871). and two daughters: Emma Martha (1813-?) and Jane Bunn (1814-?).

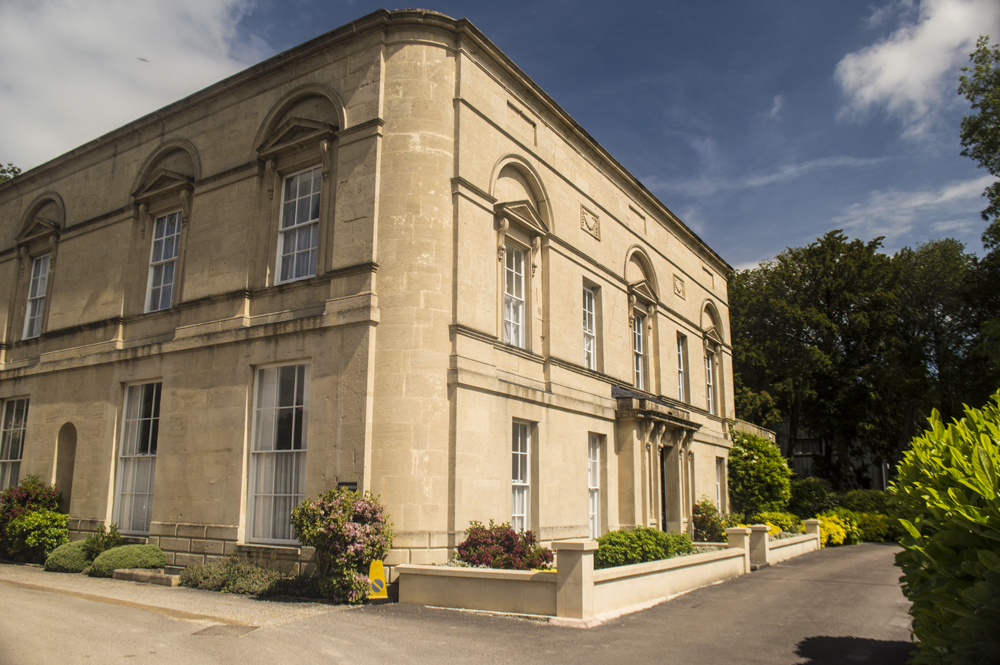
Fromefield House, Bath Road, Frome

When George took over the family business, its only buildings were in Willow Vale: a warehouse and a fulling mill. They used the Town Mill, behind the Blue House. He bought a mill at Rodden, converting it from a flour mill. In 1795 he expanded the factory at Rodden, introducing scribbling engines; these replaced the first process of hand-carding in sorting out wool fibres. He worked with his brother Henry until Henry retired; then he went into a long partnership with his cousin William Hulbert Sheppard of Keyford House. In 1803 William complained to government commissioners of the difficulty of introducing a gig mill for treating the nap of cloth. At a time of rising unemployment, in part because of the increasing mechanisation of cloth production, the price of potatoes provoked a riot in Frome in 1816. Magistrates read the Riot Act and suppressed the trouble with local militia and dragoons, preventing an attack on a Sheppard factory. At Spring Gardens the Sheppard partnership had established a factory and three mills. He built two dozen cottages on Innox Hill for his workers, close enough for them to work irregular hours when required. The Spring Gardens works were later to enlarged and operated with steam engines by 1824. In full production they were producing broadcloths, kersey, doeskins and other cloths every week, 5000 yards of cloth.

He had Fromefield House built for himself and family in 1797. The early 19th-century extension of the garden of Fromefield House involved the levelling of a barrow, which was partly dug out in 1819-20 before the garden was landscaped. These diggings (which were not well recorded) apparently discovered five human skeletons, sherds of Neolithic pottery and limestone slabs apparently forming walled chambers. The house received its water supply from a nearby spring - hence Spring Road on the corner of which the house stands. There were two 'modern' amenities installed, now both gone: an ice house and a bath house (which had two rooms, the cold stream-fed pool and a changing room with a fireplace.

In 1803 he became a trustee of the Almhouses, Blue School, and Keyford Asylum. His son Thomas Byard joined him as a trustee in 1832. In the same year he was one of those, alongside Thomas Bunn, who supported financially the emigration of Frome inhabitants to Canada as part of the work of a 'Committee for the Relief and Employment of the Poor'.

His youngest sons, Walter and Alfred Byard never entered the family trade, the latter becoming an attorney and solicitor in Lincoln's Inn Fields.

Thomas Bunn was a frequent visitor to Fromefield House. He was friendly with Mary, George's wife. At her death in 1838, he commented: "At our visit she received us in her garden with such kindness sweetness and affability that a friendship commenced without the shadow of a cloud from thence to the day. When I have been ill she visited me consoled me and talked and conversed with me. .... I was affected as we passed through the town at seeing so unexpectedly the shops closed."

Before his death in 1855, George had handed over the management of the cloth business to the two eldest sons, Thomas Byard and George Wood. Their partnership lasted until the firm closed. Changes in fashion in part had caused the decline: the black shiny broadcloth which was their speciality was replaced by checked and patterned cloths. Their conservatism killed the trade. In 1875, George Wood became a founder member of the Frome Cottage Hospital. This small eleven-bed unit was on the corner of Castle Street and Trinity Street and was a precursor of the Frome Victoria Hospital of 1901; unusually for the town, it was a Georgian brick building.

== John Sheppard (1785–1879) writer ==
The youngest son of John Shepherd (c1680-1720) was another John (c1710-1795) who had four children, Sophie, John, Joseph and Sarah. Of these John (c1748-92) had a son also named John. After his father's death, this John and his mother joined the Baptists, to which most of his relatives belonged. His uncle Walter (1735-1814) bequeathed him his share of the cloth business (£30,000) and he was able to become a man of independent means, finishing his education at Edinburgh University and taking up life as a writer and unpaid preacher. He published a book of verse in 1837: "An Autumn Dream"., "in which he discusses the affairs of heaven in verse," a Calvinistic version of Dante's Paradiso.

In 1871 John Sheppard made an address at the installation of the fountain in the Market Place, along with the donor Rev Boyle.

He had courage in his opinions. After one lecture, he spoke out against its 'nonsense, infidelity and paganism', offering to fight the lecturer like a man. Frome was well-known for its Sunday School processions on Whitsun Monday, Anglicans marching to their churches, non-conformists marching to theirs. In 1874 The Times recorded that Mr Sheppard asked who one small crowd was as the children marched by. The leader replied, 'We be a split from the Primitives'. Mr Shepard commented, 'Ah, my good man, that's what we all are.'

He died in 1879 in Frome and was buried in the dissenter's cemetery.

== Emma Sheppard (1813-1871) writer and workhouse reformer ==
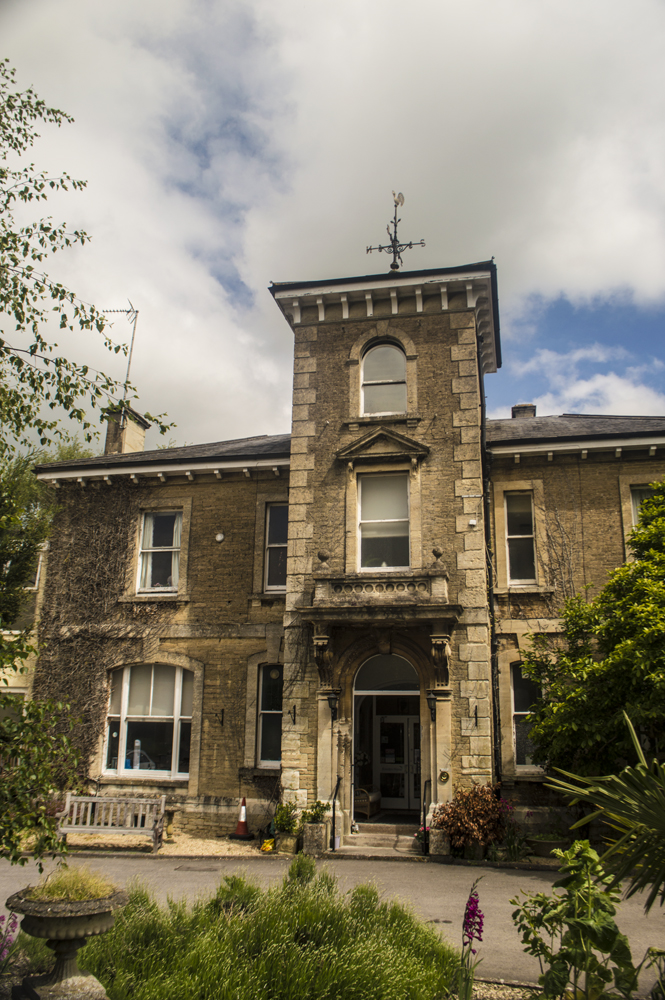
The Emma Sheppard Centre, Rowden House, Vallis Road, Frome

Emma Brown from Bath married George Wood Sheppard in 1834; they had a daughter, Mary Stuart in 1841. They first lived in Berkley House. In 1848, by which time she had seven children, they moved into Fromefield House with George Sheppard senior, some ten years after the death of his wife, Mary Ann Stuart Byard.

Emma's husband was a pillar of local society: a JP, chair of the Board of Guardians which ran the workhouse as part of the Poor Law Amendment Act 1834, vice-president of the Frome Literary and Scientific Institution (now the Frome Museum), trustee of Frome charities, supporter of the Frome School of Art (founded by Singer) and of the Church Missionary Society. The Frome Times documented his public life. He addressed Queen Victoria at a levee in 1842. In this milieu, his wife had opportunities to examine the lives of less fortunate members of society.

In 1833, a cottage was built on the corner of Bath and Rodden Roads. This was built as a Dame school on her behest, before their marriage, as a school for the domestic servants and estate workers of Fromefield House.

Emma became interested in the workhouse and its inhabitants. She was initially taken aback by the empty life of the hospital wards and the lack of simple everyday comforts. Her own children prompted her to provide gifts to the pauper children. The Temperance Hotel in the Market Place agreed to supply twopence of hot drink and bread and butter for a ticket-card given to local beggars; Emma reimbursed the costs. Quite quickly she adopted the position of a workhouse reformer. She wrote a pamphlet in 1857: 'Experiences of a Workhouse Visitor'. This was circulated privately and gained so much attention that in 1859 as Mrs George Wood Sheppard, she expanded it into a book, "Sunshine in the Workhouse". There she gives examples "she has successfully arranged, by the aid of private assistance, to keep aged persons from the workhouse, and this seems to be a very legitimate mode of applying charity, and a likely means of encouraging persons to exert themselves in maintaining, at least partly, their aged relations. One shilling a week added to the 2s.6d. allowed by the parish is found to be sufficient to keep them at home." She noted the extreme cleanliness of existing workhouses, but astutely commented that they were ‘painfully spotless, making one almost shudder to think of daily scouring under the beds and feet of the sick and rheumatic’. She was distressed by "the monotonous rituals of cleaning.... which both disturb the bedridden inmates and potentially increase their rheumatic pain." She wrote to The Times of her concern for paupers with venereal disease: "Once they have recovered from the disease that brought them into the workhouse, they are ‘driven from the “foul ward,” (properly so called,) into the “wide, wide, world,” to inevitable iniquity’." She proposed that a simple thing, such as replacing the tin mug used for drinking tea with a cup and saucer, would improve the comfort and dignity of the aged. In 1860 she wrote another book: "An Outstretched Hand to the Fallen". In this she wrote: "the purer, the more ignorant of vice the lady is who seeks them, the greater the influence she has."

At Emma Sheppard's Home in Frome, inmates were free to leave the home during the day, and sometimes worked outside the home, coming back at night. She disapproved of institutions which took away the freedom of their inmates, arguing that they were, "I think, misnamed, being more a system for criminals than for penitents."

In 1871 she died of a stroke while visiting her brother, a vicar in Wokingham. When her funeral took place in Frome, hundreds of people attended, including children from the workhouse.

In 1882 evidence from her writings were given before a Select Committee of the House of Lords on the law relating to the Protection of Young Girls.

A dementia day care centre opened in Rowden House, 2 Vallis Road, Frome in 2013. It is named the Emma Sheppard Centre.

== In dispute with the vicar ==
Thomas Byard Sheppard (1805–1886) was a son of George Sheppard and of Mary Ann Stuart Byard, He lived in Frome throughout his life. He and his wife were frequently visited by Thomas Bunn, who was a fellow trustee of the Almhouses, Blue School, and Keyford Asylum.

In 1852 the Reverend Wiliam James Early Bennett was installed as the vicar of St John's Church, Frome. He was an Anglo-Catholic. He had previously had to resign a post in Knightsbridge and Plimlico, being accused of Ritualism in a dispute with his bishop. He soon upset many of his new congregation with the vehemence of his views, provoking many led by Edward Cockey, a local industrialist, to attend the Trinity Church instead. In 1870 Thomas Byard Sheppard accused the vicar of heresy, charging him for maintaining and publishing doctrines contrary to the Articles and Formularies of the Church, regarding the presence of Christ in the Eucharist and other elements of Anglican theology, again in conflict with his bishop. The case was eventually heard in appeal to the Judicial Committee of the Privy Council in 1872 and was found to be not proven.

== Sheppards in modern times ==
Two prominent men of the 20th century are Sheppards by descent.

Tubby Clayton (1885-1972) was an Anglican clergyman and the founder of Toc H, a descendant of George Sheppard. His father was Reginald Byard Buchanan Clayton (1845-) His mother was Isabel Clayton, née Byard Sheppard (1848-1919), a daughter of George Wood Sheppard of Berkley. His grandfather was the son of Rev John Henry Clayton (born in Ashbourne, Derbyshire in 1809/10) and Jane Bunn Sheppard who was the youngest daughter of George Sheppard's youngest son, Alfred Byard.

David Sheppard (1929-2005), Baron Sheppard of Liverpool was the high-profile Bishop of Liverpool in the Church of England who played cricket for Sussex and England in his youth. His father was Stuart Morton Winter Sheppard (1895-1937) and Barbara Sheppard (née Shepherd). He is a direct descendant of William Shepherd (1735-1814), his grandfather four times removed.
