= Jack Shepherd =

Jack Shepherd or Shepard may refer to:

== People ==
- Jack Shepherd (actor) (1940–2025), British actor, playwright, and theatre director
- Jack P. Shepherd (born 1988), British actor, in Coronation Street
- Jack Shepard (baseball) (1931–1994), American
- Jack Shephard (para-badminton) (born 1997), English para-badminton player
- Jack Shepherd (fl. 2010s–2020s), co-host of The Baby-Sitters Club Club
- Jack Shepherd (footballer) (born 2001) British footballer
- Jack Shepherd (politician), Australian politician
- Jack Shepherd (diplomat), New Zealand public servant and diplomat

== Fiction ==
- Jack Shephard, character in the TV series Lost
- Little Jack Sheppard, 1885 burlesque melodrama
- Jack Shepherd, character in the TV series Queenie's Castle
- Jack Shepard, character in the film Zoom
- Jack Shepard, character in the film Frequency

== See also ==
- John Shepherd (disambiguation)
- Jack Sheppard (disambiguation)
