= John Shepherd =

John Shepherd may refer to:

== Law and politics ==
- John Shepherd (Australian politician) (1849–1893)
- John Shepherd (diplomat) (born 1943), British diplomat
- John T. Shepherd (born 1987), United States district judge

== Science and medicine ==
- John Thompson Shepherd (1919–2011), British-American physician and medical researcher
- John Shepherd (scientist) (born 1946), British environmental scientist
- John Shepherd (physicist) (born 1962), American medical physicist

== Sports ==
- John Shepherd (jockey) (1765–1848), English jockey
- John James Shepherd (1884–1954), British tug of war competitor
- John Shepherd (footballer, born 1932) (1932–2018), English footballer
- John Shepherd (cricketer) (born 1943), West Indian cricketer
- John Shepherd (footballer, born 1945), English footballer

== Others ==
- John Shepherd (priest) (died 1713), Irish Anglican priest
- John Shepherd (governor and chairman) (1792–1859), British business director
- John Shepherd (RAF officer) (1919–1946), British military flying ace
- John Shepherd (actor) (born 1960), American actor and producer

== Other uses ==
- John Elwood Shepherd, fictional manga character

== See also ==
- Henry John Shepherd (1784–1855), English politician
- Jack Shepherd (disambiguation)
- John Sheppard (disambiguation)
- John Shepard III (1886–1950), American radio executive
- John Shepherd-Barron (1925–2010), Scottish inventor
