= Catherine M. Gordon =

American pediatrician and professor

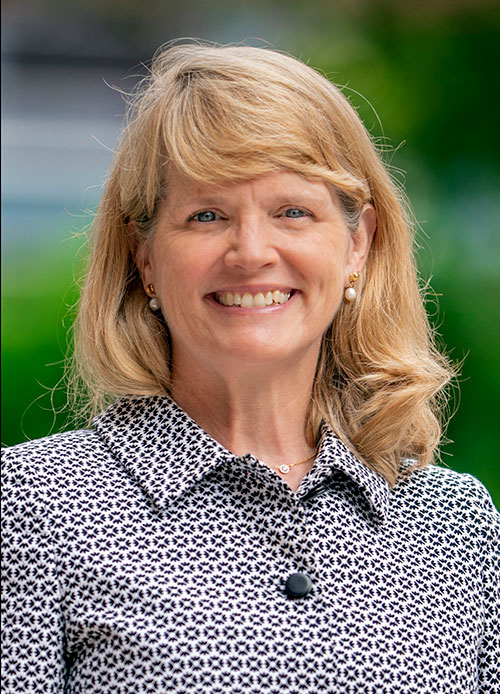
- Education: University of North Carolina; Harvard Medical School; North Carolina State University
- Scientific career
- Workplaces: Boston Children’s Hospital; Baylor College of Medicine; Texas Children's Hospital National Institutes of Health

Catherine Mason Gordon is an American pediatrician who is clinical director of the Eunice Kennedy Shriver National Institute of Child Health and Human Development, National Institutes of Health.

== Early life and education ==
Gordon was an undergraduate student at the North Carolina State University, where she studied biochemistry. She moved to the University of North Carolina at Chapel Hill for her medical degree. After graduating with honors, Gordon moved to Boston. She was a medical resident in pediatrics at the Boston Children's Hospital and served as Chief of Adolescent Medicine. After completing her residency, Gordon was appointed a research fellow in adolescent medicine, working under Norman Spack who founded the first pediatric transgender program in the US. She was particularly interested in reproductive endocrinology and bone health. She completed two graduate degrees at Harvard Medical School, focusing on public health and clinical investigation.

== Research and career ==
As an attending physician at the Boston Children's Hospital, Gordon started working on bone loss in women with anorexia nervosa. Patients with anorexia often suffer from weak bones, and Gordon pioneered hormonal treatments to restore bone strength. She founded the hospital's bone health program, making use of peripheral quantitative computed tomography and dual-energy X-ray absorptiometry to establish guidelines for densitometry measurements. In 2018, Gordon joined the Board of NEJM Journal Watch Pediatrics and Adolescent Medicine. She was appointed to the Council of the American Pediatric Society in 2020.

Gordon was appointed Pediatrician-in-Chief at the Texas Children's Hospital and Chair of Pediatric Medicine at the Baylor College of Medicine in 2021. She was the first woman to be elected Pediatrician-in-Chief and, at the time, one of only three women "in-Chiefs" of US News & World Report Honor Roll hospitals. She looked to form partnerships with middle and high schools around Houston and launched a women's health event focused on providing information about puberty, digital safety and vaccines.

Gordon's opinion piece “Caught in the Middle: The Care of Transgender Youth in Texas”, published in Pediatrics on March 31, 2022, expressed concerns regarding practicing pediatric endocrinology in Texas under Governor Greg Abbott and Attorney General Ken Paxton. On April 29, Texas Children's Hospital abruptly announced her resignation.

During the COVID-19 pandemic, Gordon highlighted the impact of the virus on the mental health of children and adolescents. In particular, she emphasized the need for parents to be aware of the signs of eating disorders in children. Whilst eating disorders primarily impact teenagers, Gordon identified that the disruption in routines and isolation during the pandemic had caused eating disorders in children under the age of ten.

Gordon joined the National Institute of Child Health and Human Development, National Institutes of Health in 2023. She serves as the Clinical Director of the Division of Intramural Research, and runs the Adolescent Bone & Body Composition Laboratory, which seeks to understand factors during adolescence that impact bone density and skeletal strength during the adult years.

== Awards and honors ==
- 2005 Presidential Early Career Award for Scientists and Engineers
- 2008 North Carolina State University Distinguished Engineering Alumnus Award
- 2014 Elected member of the American Pediatric Society
- 2015 Thomas A. Hazinski Distinguished Service Award
- 2019 International Society for Clinical Densitometry Dr. Paul D. Miller Award
- 2021 Society for Adolescent Health and Medicine Outstanding Achievement Award

== Selected publications ==
- Catherine M Gordon; Kerrin C DePeter; Henry A Feldman; Estherann Grace; S Jean Emans (2004). "Prevalence of vitamin D deficiency among healthy adolescents". JAMA Pediatrics. 158 (6): 531–537. doi:10.1001/archpedi.158.6.531. PMID 15184215. Wikidata Q39686796.
- Catherine M Gordon; Laura K Bachrach; Thomas O Carpenter; et al. (2008). "Dual energy X-ray absorptiometry interpretation and reporting in children and adolescents: the 2007 ISCD Pediatric Official Positions". Journal of Clinical Densitometry. 11 (1): 43–58. doi:10.1016/j.jocd.2007.12.005. PMID 18442752. Wikidata Q53216533.
- Nicola J Crabtree; Asma Arabi; Laura K Bachrach; et al. (2014). "Dual-energy X-ray absorptiometry interpretation and reporting in children and adolescents: the revised 2013 ISCD Pediatric Official Positions". Journal of Clinical Densitometry. 17 (2): 225–242. doi:10.1016/j.jocd.2014.01.003. PMID 24690232. Wikidata Q87580460.
