= Emma Sheppard =

English workhouse reformer (1813–1871)

Emma Sheppard (1813–1871) was an English writer and workhouse reformer in Frome, who became widely known for her book Sunshine in the Workhouse and for efforts, both local and national, to improve conditions for inmates.

== Early life ==
Emma Brown from Bath married George Wood Sheppard (1807–1894), the second son of George Sheppard, in 1834; they had a daughter, Mary Stuart in 1841. They first lived in Berkley House. In 1848, by which time she had had seven children, they moved into Fromefield House with George Sheppard senior, some ten years after the death of his wife, Mary Ann Stuart Byard.

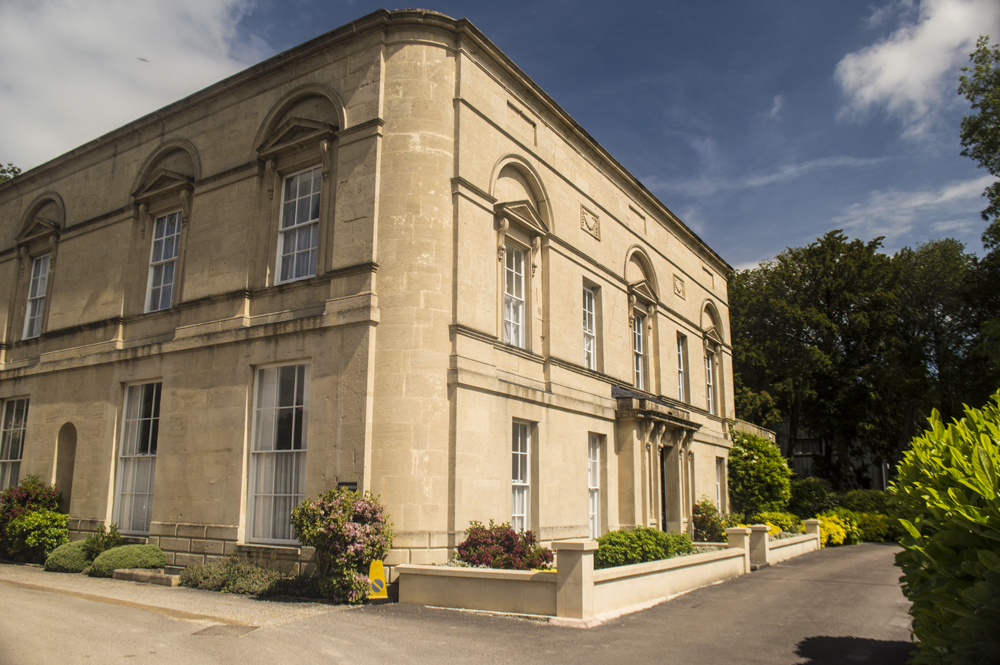
Fromefield House, Bath Road, Frome

Emma's husband was a pillar of local society: a JP, chair of the Board of Guardians which ran the workhouse as part of the Poor Law Amendment Act 1834, vice-president of the Frome Literary and Scientific Institution (now the Frome Museum), trustee of Frome charities, supporter of the Frome School of Art (founded by Singer) and of the Church Missionary Society. The Frome Times documented his public life. He addressed Queen Victoria at a levee in 1842. In this milieu, his wife had opportunities to examine the lives of less fortunate members of society.

In 1833, a cottage was built on the corner of Bath and Rodden Roads. This was built as a Dame school on her behest, before their marriage, as a school for the children of domestic servants and estate workers of Fromefield House.

== In the Community ==
Emma became interested in her husband's local endeavours, particularly the workhouse and its inhabitants, making her first visits in 1850. She was initially taken aback by the empty life of the hospital wards and the lack of simple everyday comforts. Quite quickly she adopted the position of a workhouse reformer.

In 1857 Emma wrote a pamphlet anonymously: 'Experiences of a Workhouse Visitor'. This was published by James Nisbet of Berners Street, London (now absorbed by James Clarke and Co Ltd.). The fifteen pages were printed and sold for threepence a copy in Penney's bookshop in Frome. It was that shop and circulating library in 3 Bath Street which was the first premises in Frome to be lit by gas supplied by Edward Cockey in 1831. In the pamphlet she talks of seven years experience within a workhouse of 800 inmates. She advocates small changes to the regime that would enhance the life of the inmates: provision of a cup-and-saucer rather than 'one tin, which looks more fit for my dog to drink its water from'; more solid fuel than the gruel offered; above all, that the inmates be allowed out into the garden every day, and now and then allowed 'outside the walls to see their friends, and thus it is not a prison they are in, but an asylum for their helpless old age.' She mentions Elizabeth Fry and her efforts to ameliorate the Workhouse system.

== Sunshine in the Workhouse ==
Her pamphlet was circulated, going through four editions, and gained so much attention that in 1859 as Mrs George Wood Sheppard, she expanded it into a book, "Sunshine in the Workhouse", running to a second edition in the same year. She noted in her preface that in the year before there were 704,300 people enclosed within 624 'dull and dreary' workhouses across England and Wales; this figure did not include the able-bodied, just the old, infirm, disabled and children.

She noted the extreme cleanliness of existing workhouses, but astutely commented that they were ‘painfully spotless, making one almost shudder to think of daily scouring under the beds and feet of the sick and rheumatic’. She was distressed by 'the monotonous rituals of cleaning.... which both disturb the bedridden inmates and potentially increase their rheumatic pain.'

There she gives examples "she has successfully arranged, by the aid of private assistance, to keep aged persons from the workhouse, and this seems to be a very legitimate mode of applying charity, and a likely means of encouraging persons to exert themselves in maintaining, at least partly, their aged relations. One shilling a week added to the 2s.6d. allowed by the parish is found to be sufficient to keep them at home." She records seven specific examples and 'of several more whom I am enabling, by this added 1s. per week, to live out of the House in their extreme old age'; she would like to see a countrywide system where a small addition to local funds could support the 'aged poor' to live out their days in their own homes, though her sympathy does not extend to 'the habitually drunken and worthless', who should be sent to the Union to die.' She is clearly dissatisfied that 'English Guardians can walk through these dreary wards, and because the inmates are clothed, and fed, and warmed, think they have fulfilled our LORD's parting words, - "Inasmuch as ye did to the least of these my brethren, ye did it unto Me." '

She is aggrieved by the ill treatment meted out in some workhouse schools. One of her correspondents near London found one small girl with 'her back and arms .... covered with great weals and marks of ropes'; in this particular case, the report to the guardians of the workhouse led to the dismissal of the master and his wife. Emma herself is clear that, in spite of rules that forbad the corporal punishment of boys (there is no mention of girls) except with the prior permission of governors, such cruelty must have prevalent. 'What are the joys of these poor children? I say, none - expect an hour's shivering play in a large, cold room in winter, or, in summer, a dried-up playground - not a flower or tree in it, no outlet for busy, roving childish limbs.'

In her efforts to compare her local knowledge with other locations, she visited homes across the UK, from Limerick (where with two of her daughters she visited a penitentiary for 'fallen women') to others in the south of Ireland, and others across Somerset. She was in active correspondence with a range of parties, from Liverpool, Northamptonshire, St Pancras in London and Kingston.

She does not confine herself to her own observations but calls upon Elizabeth Fry, Sydney Smith, Thomas Arnold, Bishop Armstrong and others to support her case for greater humanity towards workhouse inmates. She asks for small changes in the Poor Law to bring this about.

== Fallen Women ==
In her pamphlet "Experiences of a Workhouse Visitor", she comes across a closed ward in Frome's Union Workhouse, the refractory or "Foul Ward". She is told it is for 'women of bad character', 'that no lady or gentleman can go in'. She finds 'ten wretched bedraggled women crouching round the fire'. Over time she is told by them: "What can we do? No one would give work to such as we; we must have either died on a dunghill, or gone back to sin."

It is difficult to ascertain how widespread prostitution was in Frome. Like anywhere in the UK in the 19th century it was certainly present. Lawlessness was in part due to economic trends. Independent workers were cast out by the developing factory system. Poverty held sway for many in a wool town where the economic power had shifted to the employers. Treatment of the poor was based on a model wherein unemployment and low wages were due to laziness rather than economics. The Poor Law Board of Guardians was established in Frome in 1837, replacing the workhouse at Welshmill that had been running since 1727, operated by the Parish Overseers of the Poor. Somerset Constabulary did not arrive in Frome till 1856 under the terms of the County and Borough Police Act 1856; other areas had already formed their own Police Forces. The contingent consisted of a superintendent, two sergeants and eighteen officers. Previous to that the law had been administered by two local constables. In the next year a new police station and magistrates court was erected in Christchurch Street West.

If the court and police records of public houses are examined, some view as to prostitution in Frome may be gathered:

- In 1856, soon after the Somerset Constabulary arrived in Frome, Superintendent Summers found six prostitutes and a group of soldiers, in the Three Swans in King Street, all worse for drink. “Do you know you have a lot of bad girls in your house?” he asked. The landlord said he had no way of knowing and let them drink on till after midnight. The next night there were even more prostitutes; one of them was ‘in a most disgraceful position’, four of the others absolutely drunk. The landlord claimed not to have seem them. He was heavily fined. The same Superintendent found four prostitutes in the tap room of the Victoria in Christchurch Street East, the landlord allowing drunkenness and disorderly conduct.
- In 1859 the Bridge Hotel was in trouble for cramming a hundred people into its small tap room, including several prostitutes. In the same year the ‘’Somerset & Wiltshire Journal’’ reported the landlord of the Clothiers Arms in Milk Street had been fined for allowing prostitutes on the premises.
- In 1862 one customer of the Three Crowns was charged along with her male companion for behaving in Bath Street ‘in a grossly indecent manner’. In the same year the Angel & Crown in Vallis Way was nearly lost its licence for drunkenness and ‘harbouring of prostitutes’.
- In 1865 prostitutes were arrested in the Bridge Hotel, in spite of surveillance by the police and threatened suspension of its licence.
- In 1868 the landlord of the Waggon & Horses in Gentle Street was fined for allowing ‘persons of notoriously bad character to assemble in his house’: four prostitutes drinking with five completely drunk customers. In the same year the landlord of the Globe in Vallis Way was fined for having ten women - some of them well known as prostitutes - drunk on his premises.
- In 1873 the landlady of the Ship (now the Artisan) in Christchurch Street West was summonsed for ‘knowingly allowing immoral characters for longer than necessary for the purpose of taking reasonable refreshment’; it was ‘an habitual resort’.
- In 1883 the landlady of the Anchor in Catherine Street was fined for ‘knowingly permitting her premises to be the habitual resort of reputed prostitutes’.

Emma Sheppard wrote to The Times of her concern for paupers with venereal disease: "Once they have recovered from the disease that brought them into the workhouse, they are ‘driven from the “foul ward,” (properly so called,) into the “wide, wide, world,” to inevitable iniquity’." In her 1859 book "Sunshine in the Workhouse", she writes of that ward: 'One may well say of it as one enters, Lasciate ogni speranza', quoting from Dante's Divine Comedy Canto III, 'Abandon hope all ye who enter here'. She saw a possible future for such women:

I tried hard to get some of them employment, but they were too ill, or had never been brought up to work. Oh! how I used to long for some kind Reformatory Asylum attached to the Union Workhouse as part of its machinery, where they would be not only fed and warmed, as they were now; but where, when recovered, they could be taught a trade and be taught to live decently. .... for want of means some are turned daily away from that door, and then think of their only alternative, starvation or sin!

By December 1859, in an appendix to the next edition of her book, she had bought

'a house in the town at £6 per annum .... I bought some second-hand beds and bedding; a little needful furniture of chairs, tables, crockery, &c.; some new coarse sheets, blankets, and counterpanes; costing me altogether about £20. Then I placed an old woman, whom I could depend on, over all.' She called a meeting of the 'fallen', some of whom she had already met in the workhouse. She offered them accommodation: 'I was going to trust to their honour, for I believed there was still a tiny corner of right good womanly feeling left in all their sin-degraded natures which would keep them from disobeying one who was trying to befriend them.' Four of the women immediately accepted her terms (no alcohol, no locks but a curfew after five o'clock) and three joined the refuge the next week.

At Emma Sheppard's Home in Frome, inmates were free to leave the home during the day, and sometimes worked outside the home, coming back at night. She disapproved of institutions which took away the freedom of their inmates, arguing that they were, "I think, misnamed, being more a system for criminals than for penitents."

This is referred elsewhere as an Institute for Magdalens. She appealed for funds in the local press on behalf of "our unfortunate sisters, without words of kindness to welcome them back to the paths of virtue and womanly happiness and peace with God". There is no current evidence of how long the home was open for or how many inmates were successfully 'saved' from prostitution, though work with Fromian prostitutes continued after her death.

In 1859 she had published another paper: "An Outstretched Hand to the Fallen". In this she wrote: 'the purer, the more ignorant of vice the lady is who seeks them, the greater the influence she has.' She asked a leading question:

English Ladies, have you ever analysed these two words - a 'Sister', - though 'fallen'. yes, high-born, gently-bred, delicately-nurtured Ladies, that poor Outcast, upon whom you cast an eye of scorn and loathing as perhaps she tramped up Regent Street this morning, looking wistfully at your luxurious carriage, .... - that poor weary, outwardly-hardened, sin-based creature - a victim to man's brutal requirements - is, in the sight of our most holy God, your Sister .... bless that gracious God who has kept you unfallen in the eyes of the world, though perhaps equally guilty in the sight of Him to whom sin is sin.

William Brett Harvey - the owner of the Somerset and Wiltshire journal for many years - was happy to commend her work and to publish letters concerning the Friendless and Fallen Society in London. She herself was a major contributor to 'The Magdalen's Friend and Female Home's Intelligencer', a monthly journal which was published from 1860 to 1864, created to reclaim fallen women and prostitutes, a “rallying point” for “Christians and Philanthropists” working in the field of the “great social evil”. "In a series of articles which include the suggestively entitled “A Fallen Sister”, “The Law of Kindness”, and “Working by Love”, she particularly opposes “Penitentiary gates and walls, and locks and bars”, offering instead a “Ministry of Love”. In her refuge there are “No reproaches for former sin, no dismal doubtings whether they would accept the offer of a new life, but a certain confidence expressed in the full and loving invitation”.

Among other contributors to the Magdelens' Friend was Christina Rossetti who worked as a volunteer from 1859 to 1870 at the St. Mary Magdalene "house of charity" in Highgate. In 1853, when the Rossetti family was in continuing financial difficulties, Christina helped her mother keep a school in Fromefield, Frome, just yards from where Emma lived in Fromefield House, but it is not known whether they ever met. Rossetti's major work in 1862, Goblin Market and Other Poems was an allegoric work about erotic desire and social redemption, a reflection on the veneer of Victorian decorum.

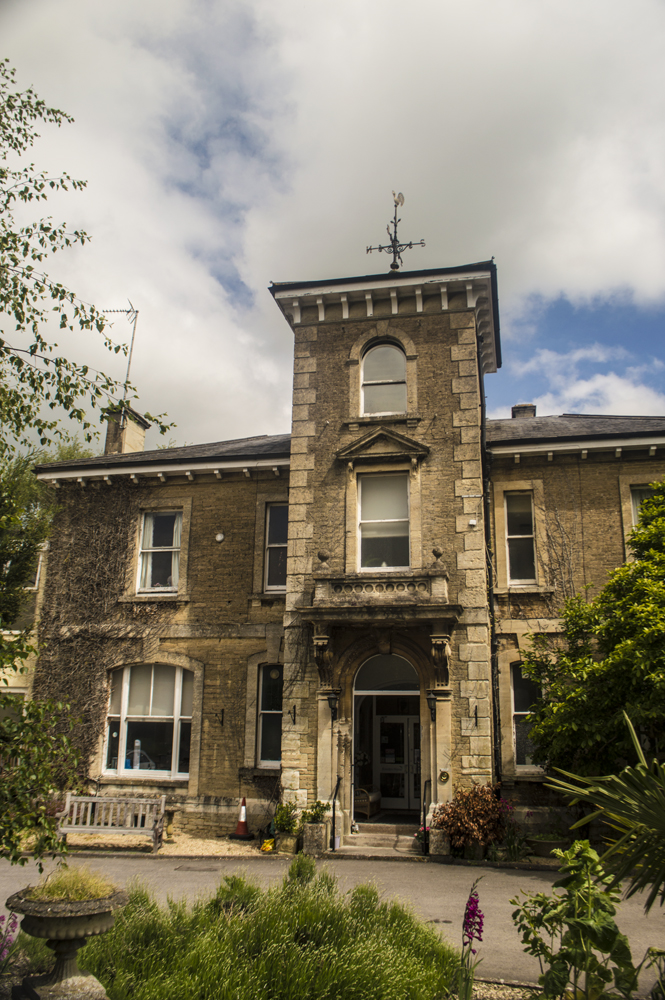
The Emma Sheppard Centre, Rowden House, Vallis Road, Frome

== Christmas in the Workhouse ==
'At Christmas time, we begged all the refuse of rich nurseries round, utter rubbish to the children who had wearied of their old toys; added £1 worth of new cheap articles; marbles in bags, balls, tops, &c. - dolls for girls - remembrances for sick children, .... and 1oz. tea, ½lb. sugar, to every grown up inmate there. Only try to throw such "sunshine in a shady place" and all who attempt it will feel that Christmas tide may be made a hundred fold happier than it was ever before.

Her own children originally prompted her to provide gifts to the pauper children. The local press recorded many examples of her Christmas visits. In 1866 the Frome Times recorded her and her family bringing 'timely gifts' and 'a bountiful supply of Christmas fare' as well as 'superadded a goodly supply of XXX from the Lamb Brewery' In 1867 she asked for contributions from the townspeople for 'new cheap toys, or old broken ones', as 'great joys to enliven the dull workhouse life'. The next year she is described as invalid, but her husband attended with family and many friends, distributing 'tokens of goodwill', along with roast beef and plum-pudding, plus strong beer at 'the usual Christmas dinner'. In 1870 she was so ill that she could not take her normal active role but she wrote to the local newspaper asking 'to spare me a basket of apples or walnuts, or buy me some oranges, buns or"sweeties" for the children'. That Christmas her husband and several of her children 'spent three hours in amusing and comforting the inmates'.

== Her Christian message ==
All of her writing is imbued with the Christian faith, simple but muscular. She had been challenged by a clerical friend to reject the view that "the kind sympathy of a Christian woman's heart is just the soft soap which we require to make our mechanisms work." Her initial forays into the workhouse had been 'done so quietly that only my immediate family friends knew'. In her book 'Sunshine in the Workhouse, she adopts a stronger tone: 'our Great All-Father says to us: "If they brother be waxen poor, and his hand faileth, then thou shalt relieve him, yea, though he be a stranger or sojourner, that he may live with thee".' Her message is plain, addressed to any who are responsible for looking after the needy, whether politicians, local and national, or members of the public, who show no sympathy. 'We are not, as a Christian nation, doing our loving duty towards those of our beloved land, who are in the Union Houses for no fault of their own; those who, from having no near or dear ones left to them to shelter their declining years, have no other home. She has a sharp view on the hypocrisy of men:

Oh English brothers! you speak loathingly of the sinner - do you of the sin? have you never drawn an innocent girl into evil, and then recklessly left her to the awful fate which must ensue when maiden purity and modesty is a tale of the past alone? and now, when these needful means are spoken of, so as to give her another chance of rising from the ruin into which you have plunged her, do you, as respectable Members of Parliament, as Guardians of the Poor, as Magistrates and upholders of right, and putters down of wrong - do you now ignore all thoughts of the kind? and will you leave these poor women, more sinned against on the whole than sinning - will you leave them to their sad and outcast fate, no one caring for body and soul any more than if they were the "brutes that perish"?

When visiting, Emma often brought some gifts with her: fabric, toys, household goods, items of food to distribute to whomsoever she met. She talked with inmates, quietly and confidentially, listening to their stories, lending them books like Robinson Crusoe, Uncle Tom or The Pilgrim's Progress; often she prayed with them or read from the Bible, and encouraged them to sing a hymn together. She tended the dying, whether the final illness was because of ageing infirmity or from venereal disease, careful to show 'the absence of loathing'. The sight of public begging and the likely misuse of such money led her to make an arrangement with the Temperance Hotel in the Market Place to supply twopence of hot drink and bread and butter for a ticket-card issued instead of coins; she reimbursed the costs. Her help is practical, given because of her Christian faith, but always inclusive of those who needed help, whatever their history. She was not on a mission to spread Christianity; her faith was the personal context for her profound humanity. Every one was worthy of care and consideration in her eyes.

== Legacy ==
In 1871 Emma died of a stroke while visiting her brother, a vicar in Wokingham. After a cortege brought her from the railway station, the funeral took place at Holy Trinity Church 'where she had so long worshipped'. 'At the grave the scene was one of striking solemnity .... there were hundreds of mourners - of very class, including even the little ones from the Workhouse'.

In 1882 evidence from her writings were given before a Select Committee of the House of Lords on the law relating to the Protection of Young Girls.

No extant photograph or other form of portrait of Emma or of her husband are known to exist.

A dementia day care centre opened in Rowden House, 2 Vallis Road, Frome in 2013. It is named the Emma Sheppard Centre. It specialises in care for dementia patients and their families, offering a range of stimulating activities, much in sympathy with her original wishes for the daily life and well-being of workhouse inmates.
