= John Sheppard (writer) =

English religious writer

John Sheppard (15 October 1785 – 30 April 1879) was an English religious writer.

== Life ==
Born on 15 October 1785 at Frome, Somerset, where the Sheppard family had resided for a century, he was son of Mary Kelson, daughter of John Banger of Puddletown, Dorset, and her husband, John Sheppard (c1748-92). He left school in 1800 to enter the woollen trade, in which most of the family were engaged. In 1806, after his father's death, he and his mother joined the Baptists, to which many of his relatives belonged. With John Foster, a Baptist minister in Frome for a period from 1804, Sheppard developed a close friendship.

The death of his uncle, Walter Sheppard, who made him his heir, allowed Sheppard to retire from business. In 1812 he entered the University of Edinburgh as a medical student, but switched to the study of philosophy and Hebrew. During two years' residence at Edinburgh he formed friendships with Thomas Chalmers and John Pinkerton. In 1816 and 1817 he made tours through France, Italy, Switzerland, and Germany, and studied for some months at Göttingen. In 1818 he married; his wife died 16 months later, giving birth to a son, Walter. In 1823 Sheppard published his Thoughts preparative or persuasive to Private Devotion, which went through five editions in as many years. Then for the rest of his life he concentrated on religious authorship, lay preaching, and foreign travel. He undertook active involvement in the affairs of the Particular Baptists. In 1837 he published An Autumn Dream, a popular blank verse poem over 150 pages that went into three editions. It was a Calvinistic version of Dante's Paradiso.

In February 1838, he talked with a friend, Thomas Bunn and told him he was experiencing considerable disquiet ‘about fixing the professional destination of his only son’. Bunn believed that Walter possessed ‘the best principles and dispositions’, and was ‘an agreeable person’ with ‘a good capacity and health’. Later that same year Walter, at the age of 19, became insane.

In 1871 John Sheppard made an address at the installation of the Boyle Cross fountain in the Market Place, along with the donor Rev Boyle. Rev T G Rooke was also present on that occasion; in 1881 he edited the first of five of his own editions of Sheppard's Thoughts chiefly designed as preparative or persuasive to Private Devotion.

Sheppard died at Frome on 30 April 1879, and was buried in the dissenters' cemetery. He was twice married.

== Works ==
Sheppard wrote:

- Athaliah, translated from Racine, 1815.
- Letters on a Tour in France, London, 1817.
- Thoughts preparative or persuasive to Private Devotion, 1823.
- An Autumn Dream, poem, London, 1837; 2nd edit. 1841.
- Cursory View of the State of Religion in France, London, 1838.
- On Dreams, London, 1847.
- On Trees, their Uses and Biography, London, 1848.
- The Foreign Sacred Lyre, London, 1857.
- The Christian Harp, London, 1858.
- [ed] Hymns, Psalms and Poems by Anne Steele, with a memoir by John Sheppard, London, 1863.

== Notes ==
Attribution

This article incorporates text from a publication now in the public domain: Lee, Sidney, ed. (1897). "Sheppard, John (1785-1879)". Dictionary of National Biography. Vol. 52. London: Smith, Elder & Co.
