= Jack Sheppard (disambiguation) =

Jack Sheppard was a British criminal.

Jack Sheppard may also refer to:

- Jack Sheppard (cave diver) (1909–2001), British cave diver
- Jack Sheppard (cricketer) (born 1992), English cricketer
- Jack Sheppard (novel), 1839
- Little Jack Sheppard, an 1885 burlesque melodrama written by Henry Pottinger Stephens and William Yardley

== See also ==
- Jack Shepherd (disambiguation)
