= John Shepherd (physicist) =

American physicist

- Born: John A. Shepherd; 1962 (age 63–64); Austin, Texas
- Education: Texas Tech University (BS); University of Virginia (PhD)
- Occupation: Medical physicist
- Years active: 1986-present
- Organization(s): University of Hawaii; University of California San Francisco
- Known for: Radiomics

John A. Shepherd (born 1962) is an American physicist, professor of epidemiology and population sciences and director of the Shepherd Research Laboratory at the University of Hawaii Cancer Center in Honolulu, Hawaii. He is an expert in the use of dual-energy X-ray absorptiometry (DXA) for quantitative bone and soft tissue imaging, and pioneered the use of 3D optical imaging of the whole body for quantifying body composition and associated diseases including cancer risk, obesity, diabetes, and frailty. In 2016, he was the President of the Board of the International Society for Clinical Densitometry.

== Early life and education ==
Shepherd was born in Austin, Texas in 1962. He studied engineering physics at Texas Tech University in Lubbock, Texas, where he obtained his Bachelor of Science degree. He continued his education at the University of Virginia in Charlottesville, Virginia, where he received his PhD in engineering physics in 1993. He was the first to develop scintillating vapor-deposited Na(Tl) thin films for photon counting imaging detectors grown with a columnar structure for high spatial resolution. He did his postdoctoral studies in biophysics at the Princeton University, where he adapted a phosphor created for color TV to emit green light well matched to the absorption of modern solid state detectors with very fast light output.

== Career ==
Shepherd designs and develops dual-energy X-ray absorptiometry systems, mammography and 3D optical biomarkers used to evaluate the risk of osteoporosis, breast cancer, and obesity. He serves as the principal investigator for the National Institute of Diabetes and Digestive and Kidney Diseases funded Shape Up! Adults and Kids cohort.

Since 2020, Shepherd and his research team at the University of Hawaii Honolulu Cancer Center are working on Astro-3DO, the project which will use 3D optical cameras to measure the body shape and mass composition of astronauts in space. The work is supported by The Translational Research Institute for Space Health (TRISH).

Since 2021, he was appointed as Deputy Director and Chief Scientific Officer at the University of Hawaii Honolulu Cancer Center.

== Awards and recognition ==
- 1988 - Tau Beta Pi Engineering Honor Society (Texas Beta)
- 2002 - BIRCWH Scholar (Building Institutional Research Careers in Women's Health) NIH
- 2007 - John P. Bilezikian Global Leadership Award, International Society for Clinical Densitometry (ISCD)
- 2013 - Oscar Gluck Humanitarian Award, ISCD
- 2013 - Fulbright Scholar, Karolinska Institute, Stockholm, Sweden Fulbright Program, United States Department of State
- 2016 - President of ISCD
- 2021 - American Institute of Biological and Medical Engineering Fellow
- 2024 - B.H. and Alice C. Beams Endowed Professor of Medicine Award
- 2024 - College of Fellows of the American Association of Physicists in Medicine

== Patents ==
- Multiple modality body composition analysis
- Bone densitometry using x-ray imaging systems
- Determining body composition using fan beam dual-energy x-ray absorptiometry
- Methods and apparatus for determining proportions of body materials
- Method for Assessing bone characteristics using digital 2-dimensional x-ray detector
- Device and method for determining proportions of body materials
- Anthropometry by two-dimensional radiographic imaging
- Bioimpedance measurement device and method

== See also ==
- International Society for Clinical Densitometry
