= Church of the Holy Trinity, Frome =

Church in Somerset, England

Frome Holy Trinity
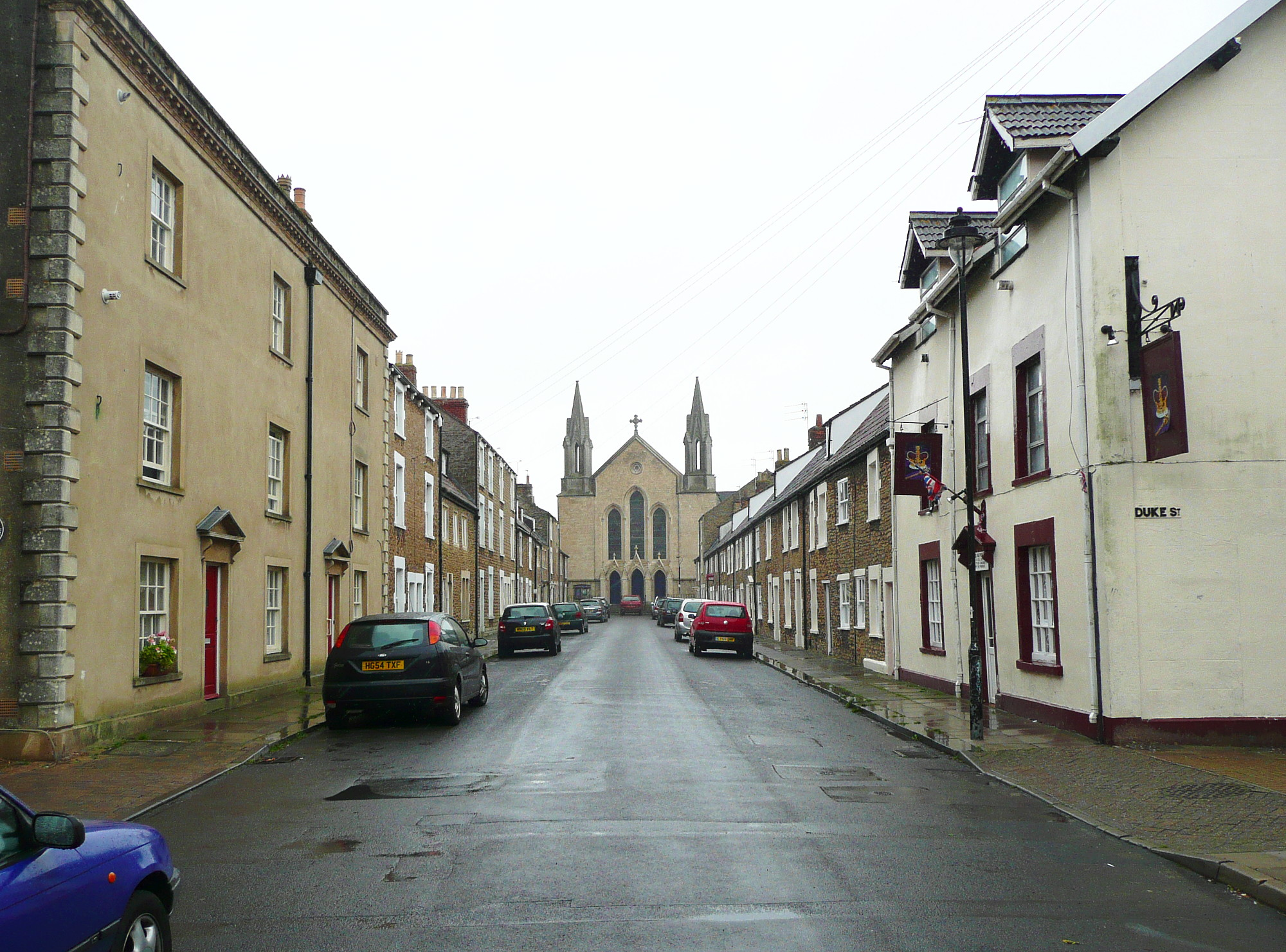

- Location within Somerset
- 51.2338°N 2.3280°W
- Location: Frome, Somerset, England

History
- Built: 1837

Listed Building – Grade II*
- Official name: Frome Holy Trinity
- Designated: 31 January 1974
- Reference no.: 1174175

The Frome Holy Trinity in Frome, Somerset, England was built in 1837. It is a Grade II* listed building.

== History ==
The church was built in 1837, by Henry Goodridge, as a Commissioners' church in a Gothic revival style.

Emma Sheppard, workhouse reformer was interred in the churchyard in 1871.

In 2015 refurbishment work included new underfloor heating along with improved lighting and audio visual capabilities.

The parish and benefice of Frome (Holy Trinity) are within the Diocese of Bath and Wells.

== Architecture ==
It is a stone building. Nine of the stained glass windows were designed by Edward Burne-Jones. The figures are powerfully drawn, with vibrant colours and leafy backgrounds. They were made and installed by Morris & Co., between 1880 and 1918. A pamphlet available in the church has illustrations of all the windows with details of each commission.

The only stained glass windows which were not designed by Burne-Jones are placed above the altar and were made and installed by the Horwood Brothers in 1875, a local firm from Great Elm, to commemorate the first vicar, Rev Alfred Daniel. Sadly they did not have the same expertise of Morris & Co; some of the painting of the faces has faded.

Singer & Co installed an iron rood screen across the nave 1903–06; this has now been repositioned within a side chapel.

== See also ==
- List of ecclesiastical parishes in the Diocese of Bath and Wells
