= Thomas Sheppard (MP) =

Former MP of Frome, England

Thomas Sheppard (1766 – 1 June 1858) was a politician in England.

A grandson of the wealthy clothier, William Sheppard, he was elected at the 1832 general election as the Member of Parliament (MP) for the newly enfranchised borough of Frome in Somerset, standing as a Whig. He was re-elected in 1835 as a Conservative, and held the seat until he stood down from the House of Commons at the 1847 general election.

Frome was given the right to elect its own member of Parliament, one of 67 new constituencies, by the Reform Act of 1832. This Act removed rotten boroughs’ like Old Sarum (with 3 houses and 7 voters to elect 2 MPs) and included for the first time new electors such as small landowners, tenant farmers, and shopkeepers; voters were defined as male persons, so women were formally excluded.

The election was disputed by two well-known local men: Sir Thomas Champneys and Sheppard, a Tory and a Radical or Whig respectively. Champneys was an acknowledged slave owner. There was no serious trouble until the election itself. The two were personal enemies, with a long history of property dealings between their families over 180 years. Champneys may have been popular but he was disreputable, unmarried, and his Orchardleigh Estate was in decline and in debt. In 1820 Sheppard was a key witness when Sir Thomas was accused of sodomy; the case was not proven.

Writing about the processes of social equalization in the 19th century, George W. E. Russell recorded that Sheppard was the only member of the House of Commons to wear a pigtail after the Reform Act 1832.

Like his election nominator of 1837 Thomas Bunn, Sheppard also supported the Anti-Slavery movement, and was a delegate for Frome at the British and Foreign Anti-Slavery Convention at the Freemason's Hall, London on 12 June 1834.

In 1838 Sheppard bought the Folkington and Wootton manors in the South Downs, and built for himself a new Folkington Manor designed by the architect William Donthorne. After the death of his son in 1875, it was sold to another family.

Parliament of the United Kingdom
New constituency	Member of Parliament for Frome; 1832 – 1847	Succeeded by Robert Boyle
