= John Shepherd (priest) =

Irish Anglican priest (died 1713)

John Shepherd (died 24 February 1713) was an Irish Anglican priest in the last decades of the seventeenth and the first ones of the eighteenth centuries.

Shepherd was born in County Dublin and educated at Trinity College, Dublin. He became Vicar choral of Limerick Cathedral in 1693; Prebendary of St Munchin in 1695; Treasurer of Limerick from 1695; the Archdeacon of Ardfert in 1704; and Precentor of Killaloe in 1705.
