= John Sheppard (British Army soldier) =

- Born: 6 August 1915
- Died: 26 February 2015 (aged 99)
- Occupation: British Army soldier

Leslie Gaius John Sheppard (6 August 1915 – 26 February 2015) was the first British soldier in World War II to destroy a German tank. He has been awarded the Distinguished Conduct Medal.

Sheppard used to serve in the Leicestershire Regiment.
