= Jack Sheppard (cricketer) =

English cricketer

Personal information
- Full name: Jack David Sheppard
- Born: 29 December 1992 (age 33); Salisbury, Wiltshire, England
- Batting: Right-handed
- Bowling: Right-arm medium-fast

Domestic team information
- Years: Team
- 2013: Hampshire (squad no. 27)

Career statistics
| Competition | List A |
|---|---|
| Matches | 1 |
| Runs scored | 0 |
| Batting average | 0.00 |
| 100s/50s | –/– |
| Top score | 0 |
| Balls bowled | 54 |
| Wickets | 2 |
| Bowling average | 24.50 |
| 5 wickets in innings | – |
| 10 wickets in match | – |
| Best bowling | 2/49 |
| Catches/stumpings | –/– |
- Source: Cricinfo, 7 August 2013

Jack David Sheppard (born 29 December 1992) is an English former cricketer.

== Career ==
Sheppard was born in Salisbury in December 1992. He was educated at Queen Elizabeth's School in Wimborne Minster. Sheppard made his way up though age-group cricket for Hampshire, and in early 2011 he toured Sri Lanka with the England Under-19 cricket team, making a single Youth One Day International appearance against Sri Lanka Under-19s. At the end of the 2012 season, Sheppard signed a one-year contract for the 2013 season, having impressed for South Wilts at club level in the Southern Premier Cricket League. During the 2013 season, Sheppard made a single appearance for Hampshire in a List A one-day match against a touring Bangladesh A team at the Rose Bowl. In a match which Hampshire won by 9 runs, Sheppard was dismissed without scoring by Rubel Hossain in Hampshire's innings of 223, while with the ball he took the wickets of Marshall Ayub and Hossain, finishing with figures of 2 for 49 from nine overs. Sheppard made no further appearances for Hampshire and was released at the end of the 2013 season, alongside Hamza Riazuddin, Michael Roberts, and Adam Rouse. Returning to club cricket following his release, he left South Wilts in 2014 to join Ealing in the Middlesex County Cricket League.

== External list ==
- Jack Sheppard at Cricinfo
