= Edward Cockey =

British industrialist (1781–1860)

Edward Cockey (1781–1860) was an industrial entrepreneur in Frome, Somerset, England, descended from a local family of metalworkers.

== Background ==
The early part of the nineteenth century was a hard time for Frome, industry declining over the years as its dependence on the wool trade fell. In 1826 William Cobbett commented on what he found during one of his Rural Rides in his Political Register:

These poor creatures at Frome have pawned all their things, or nearly all. All their best clothes, their blankets and sheets, their looms; any little piece of furniture that they had…….all the tolerably good clothes their children had….though this is a sort of manufacture cannot come to a complete end; still it has received a blow from which it cannot possibly recover.

In this situation, any new employment prospect was welcomed. On 10 November 1831, Mr Penny, a bookseller, stationer and circulating library owner, lit his shop in 3 Bath Street with gas for the first time, gas supplied by the upcoming enterprise of a Cockey.

== Origins of the family ==
Lewis Cockey (1626-1711) was a brazier (a person who works in brass), bellfounder and clocksmith who worked in Warminster. His eldest son, William (1663–1748) became a clockmaker. By 1692 he moved to Wincanton, continuing making clocks (four of his lantern clocks are known today) and casting bells, as well repairing them. The youngest son, Edward (1669–1768) stayed with his father and became notable for his exceptionally complicated astronomical clocks, helped by local patronage, particularly for Lord Weymouth at Longleat.

The second son, Lewis Cockey Junior (1666–1703) was a pewterer and bellfounder who moved to work in Frome in 1682 and was buried in the local church there in 1703. Lewes lived at 45 Milk Street, known as ‘The Bell House’, probably using the space at the side, now its garage, for his bell casting. A foundry was soon established in the appropriately named Bell Lane, since demolished, a short distance from the Bell House. His son, William continued the family tradition until his death in 1762. At least 23 towers in Somerset and over 40 in Wiltshire and Dorset have Cockey inscriptions on their bells. Their standard inscriptions were ‘William Cockey’ plus the year, and little else. The fine ring at St John the Baptist, Frome contains such bells – the two trebles dated 1724, and the 6th dated 1746.

However, one of the bells in the Chapel of St Lawrence, Warminster has a more unusual inscription amongst other bells in the church, including those cast either by his father or grandfather.

God made Cockey and Cockey made me
1743

After 1752 it seems the bells were cast elsewhere, placing the orders and collecting the accounts being undertaken in Frome. Christopher Cockey (1748–1792) had 7 children, among them Edward.

== 19th century expansion ==
Edward Cockey established his own firm in 1816. He is listed as a brazier and iron founder in the Market Place in 1812 through to 1820 and then a brazier, tin man and ironmonger working in Bath Street in 1821. The family diversified, Edward becoming a successful iron-founder, and began casting for the gas industry as well as building his own gas works at Welshmill, managed by his son, Henry. Frome had gas street lighting as early as 1831. Over the years he held almost the whole of the trade of the West Country in the production of gas plant and carried out many contracts in Russia and elsewhere for gasholders and the like.

in 1834 Edward and his son Henry were appointed as weights and measures inspectors for the Frome district of Somerset. The firm’s name has been seen on large cast iron weights. In 1844 Lawrence Hagley, a relative of Edward Cockey’s wife, was appointed the inspector in Frome. It was said that on Edward Cockey's daily inspection of the works if he met any item which displeased him, the person responsible, whether one of his sons, a foreman or workman, was liable to receive a heavy blow across the shoulders from a stick he always carried. Imperfect products were similarly battered.

Edward was a stalwart of his community, which in part meant he took a lead in religious matters. His eldest son, also an Edward (1809–1880), had taken vows with the Anglican Church and became Warden of Wadham College, Oxford. In his study there, the first meetings of opponents to the Anglo-Catholic Tractarian movement were held. In 1851 a new vicar arrived in Frome, Father Early Bennett. He "was one of the first Ritualists, and a most aggressive one; the church at that time, as with most others, was very Evangelical....Father Bennett made no bones about it, preached a violent Anglo-Catholic sermon,....proposed immediately to introduce vestments, incense, confession.....practically the whole congregation left, some, it is stated, walking out during the sermon. The Cockeys.....and other influential members immediately joined the then new Church of Holy Trinity and carried on the Evangelical tradition, becoming churchwardens there……"

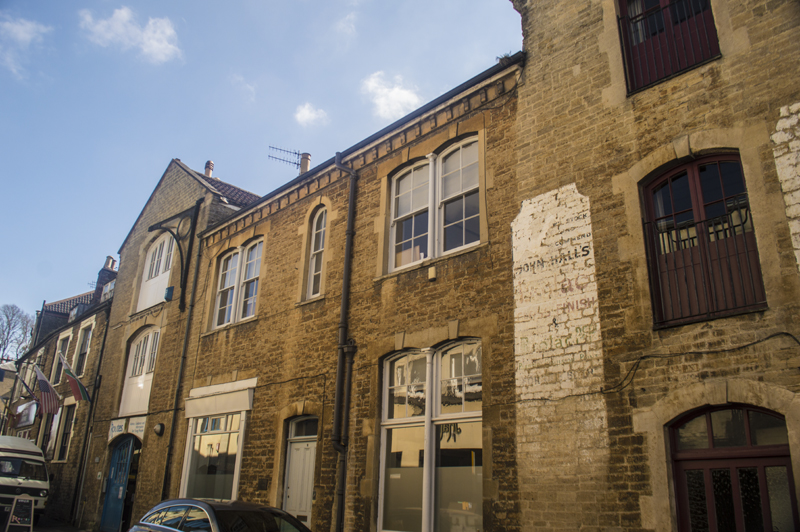
Cockey's former Palmer Street factory: note crane at lefthand of building & window-gates

By 1851 the company was employing 76 men and boys in the Palmer Street foundry, behind 10–15 Bath Street, as Edward Cockey & Sons. The company extended its work into iron foundry of all kinds: fences, gates, stairs, balustrades, boilers, valves, steam engines, roofs, gasometers. The firm made mileposts for the Salisbury to Shaftesbury road. As a growing company it supported the Gas Institute's contribution to the Great Exhibition of 1851. The gas works at Welshmill were serviced after 1854 by a railway siding for coal delivery, installed on the North Somerset Railway. They took out patents for some of their products: a cheese press (1853) and fluid regulators for gas production (1857), which were still in use well into the 20th century. After his death in 1860, two of his sons, Henry and Christopher Francis continued the management of the family business. In 1861 it was exhibiting agricultural equipment at the Royal Agricultural Exhibition in Leeds. In 1865, the firm was empowered to manufacture coke for sale. Gas pipe installation in Frome was not without its dangers. On the evening of 14 May 1871 a tremendous explosion took place next to the Ship at 6 Christchurch Street West: a 20 yard stretch of paving stones were torn up, a water closet exploded and two boys walking past were thrown into the air. Others nearby were knocked to the ground, but no one was seriously injured. It seems a newly installed gas pipe had leaked into the town drains. In 1874 a newspaper report recorded:

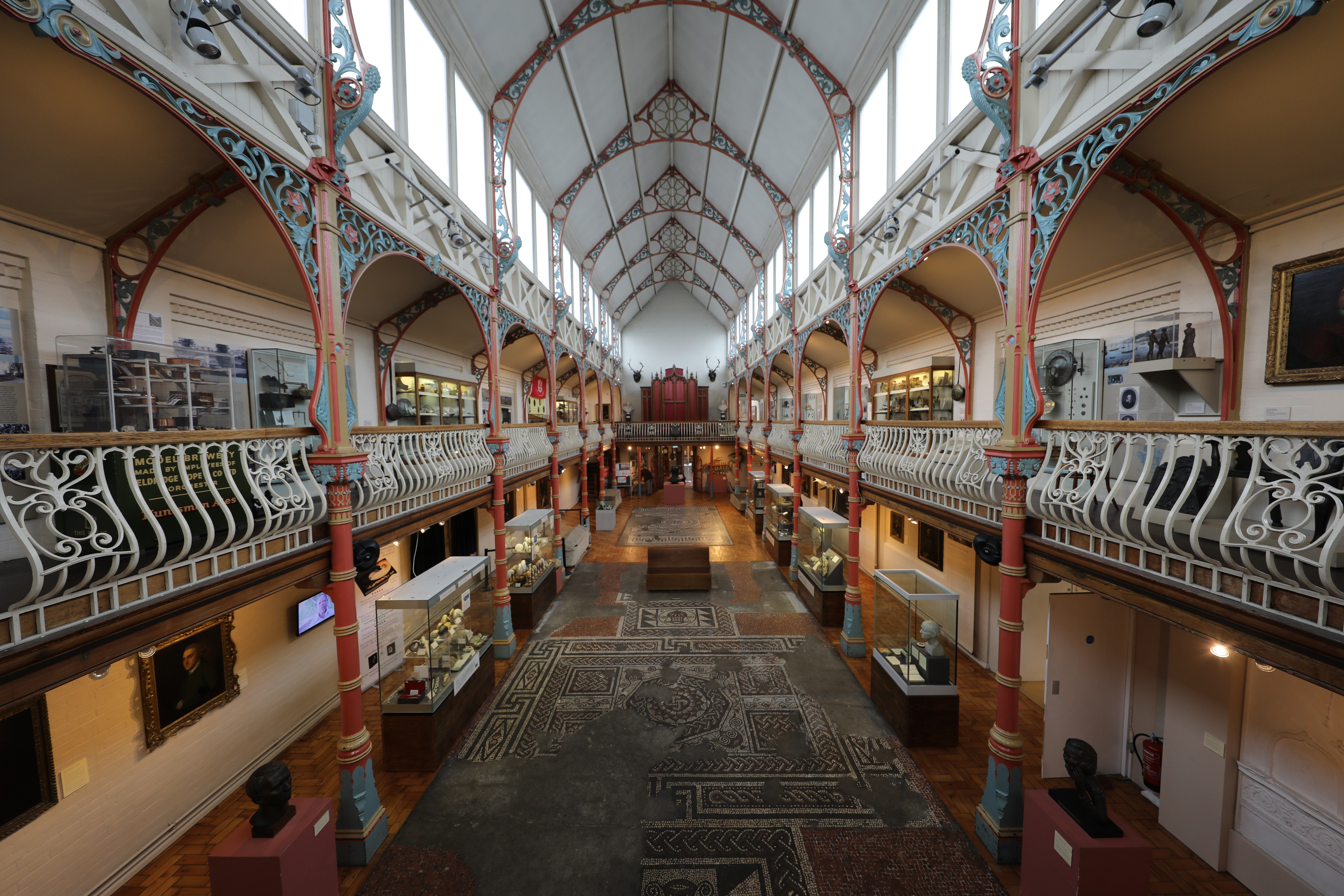
Victorian gallery in the Dorset Museum, ironwork by Cockey

The construction of a large gasholder for the Portsea Gas Co. The monster will be 162 feet in diameter & when fully extended, 54½ feet in height. It will hold about 1,100,000 cubic feet of gas, or about 14 times the contents of the biggest gasholder of the Frome Gas Co. The weight will be more than 300 tons & this great weight will float up & down in a tank of water on a bed of gas……..the rivets used in putting the parts together will exceed 14 tons in weight. The whole weight of iron will be between 700 & 800 tons.

In 1883 it produced the ornate castings for the structure of the Victorian Gallery of the Dorset County Museum. One unusual requirement in 1886 was to lay pipes in the town to supply a gas balloon for George Sanger’s circus.

In 1886 the family firm became a limited company, Edward Cockey & Sons Ltd., Henry remaining as managing director till his death in 1891, severing the last family connection. The original foundry, with its warehouse frontage of lifting crane and window-gates overlooking Palmer Street, had a space behind that was too small for their expanding business. In 1893 the work moved to Garston, east of the town centre, on to a new open site. The 1904 25" OS maps shows an Iron Works immediately south of the east-west Frome-Radstock line (the North Somerset Railway), at the western end of the railway triangle, and immediately north of Garston Lane/Garston Street. A siding off the line into the works was constructed. The buildings were mainly concentrated towards the boundaries, leaving plenty of open space to pre-assemble gasometers, before dismantling them for delivery by rail.

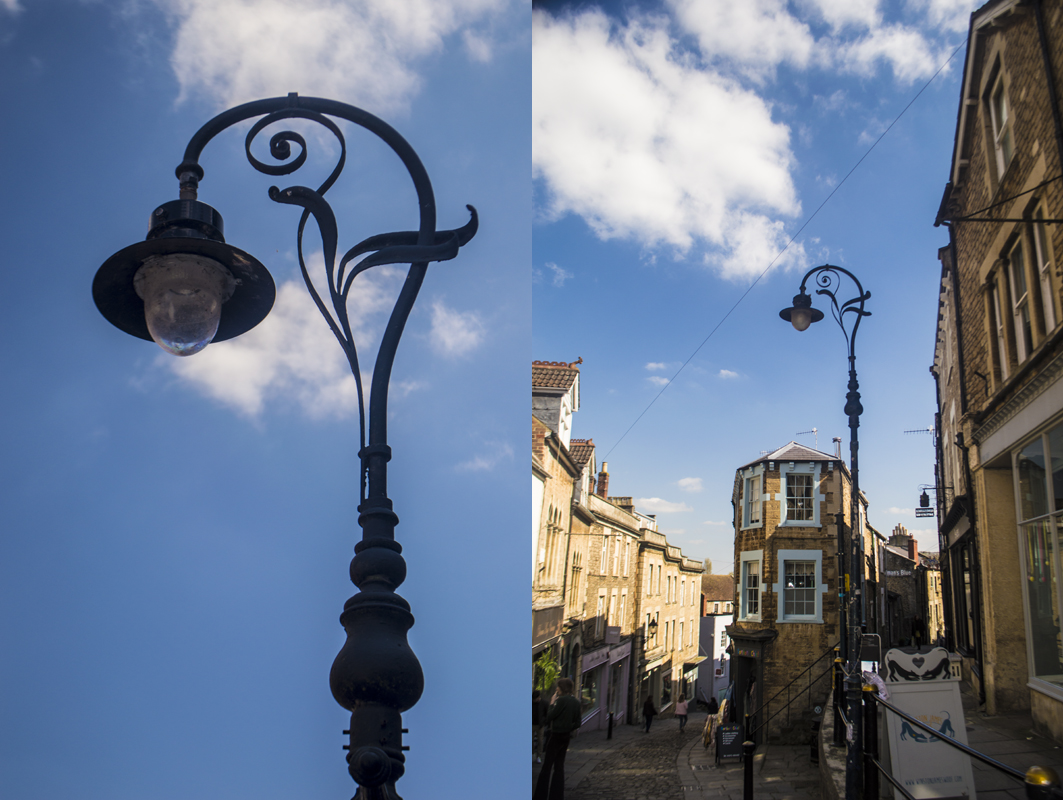
Cockey lamps in Frome: detail near St John's Church; St Catherine's Hill

== 20th century ==
From 1903, the 200 gas lamp standards erected by Cockey in Frome were converted to electricity, after a generating station was built and cables laid. They were then fitted with a replacement art nouveau leaf pattern lampholder. Over 60 survive today, not all with the leaves, some with obtrusive modern lights, a number in poor condition of paintwork. Over 20 are listed Grade II by Historic England and attributed to Singer; a specimen entry illustrating the attribution is the one for the lamp post in front of No 9 Whittox Lane, near the centre of the town. Not all of the standards are Cockey originals. The town refers to them as 'Cockey Lamps' but records of Frome Urban District Council meetings suggest the art nouveau lamp heads were designed by Singer.

By 1914 the limited company, with offices in London, were employing 250 people on the Garston site and elsewhere, working as gas engineers and contractors and making steel work. The foundry was used to pour metal into casts, making gas-holders, regulating valves and tar extractors, lamp standards and oil storage tanks. In 1927 they constructed the first waterless gasholder for Ipswich Gas Works. The Frome Gas Company, founded by Edward Cockey, was taken over by that of the Bath Gas, Coke & Light Co in 1934, before nationalisation; over the years all signs of Frome's gas works were removed.

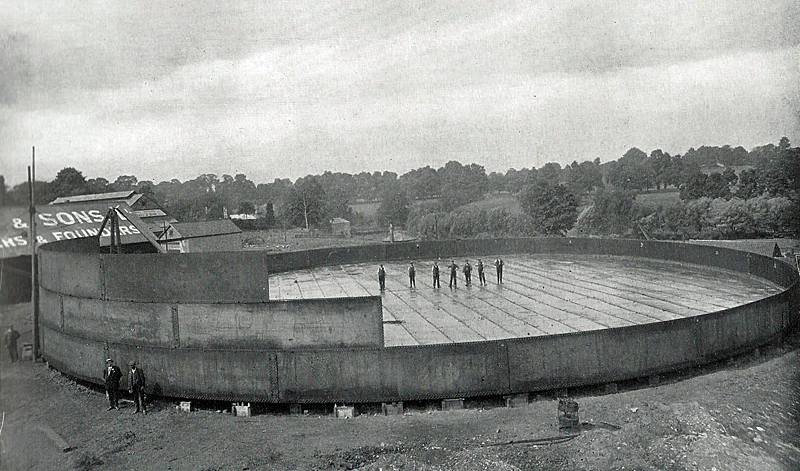
Pre-assembly of a gasometer at Cockey's Garston works, c1930s, courtesy Frome Museum

After WWI, describing themselves as 'Gas, Constructional and Chemical Engineers', gasholders and related engineering were installed at Newport, Dorchester, Widnes, Wells, Dursley, Glasgow, Margam, Bristol, and many other locations across the British Isles. They specialised in their own patented wash scrubbers: for the recovery of ammonia, tar and carbonic acid, by-products of making gas from coke or coal. Aside from the foundry there was a pattern shop for the full-size modelling of moulds or casts, a fettling shop for cleaning off the rough edges of castings and a steel plate works. During WWII, the Admiralty contracted the firm to fabricate components for Mulberry Harbours.

One worker, John Stocker whose father operated the overhead crane in the foundry, said about the premises in 1946:

"There were all these different machines, lathes, milling machines. All the machines were very, very ancient and I think that was probably the reason why they went bust!"

The firm wound up voluntarily in April 1960 but its memory remains with bollards, gate-posts, drain covers and lamp standards, many displaying the name.
