= The Baby-Sitters Club Club =

Comedy podcast

- Genre: comedy
- Language: English

Creative team
- Created by: Jack Shepherd and Tanner Greenring
- Written by: Jack Shepherd and Tanner Greenring

Cast and voices
- Hosted by: Jack Shepherd and Tanner Greenring
- Starring: Jack Shepherd and Tanner Greenring

Music
- Theme music composed by: Scott Lamb

Technical specifications
- Audio format: Podcast

Publication
- No. of episodes: As of July 2020, 238 on main feed and 75 on Patreon
- Original release: February 29, 2016
- Updates: active

Related
- Related shows: The Baby Sitters Baby Elite, Elite Baby, Little Sister BIG Episodes (on Patreon)
- Website: http://babysittersclubclub.com/

The Baby-Sitters Club Club is a comedy podcast hosted by Jack Shepherd and Tanner Greenring. The co-hosts read and analyze books from Ann M. Martin's Baby-Sitters Club series of young adult novels. The first episode was released in February 2016, and the episodes release weekly.

== Background ==
Shepherd first read the books as a child, borrowing them all from his cousin, shortly after moving from England to the United States.

Shepherd and Greenring were formerly colleagues at BuzzFeed, and have been friends for many years.

== Format ==
Episodes are generally one hour long and focus on one book.

=== Special episodes ===
- "BSCC: Secret Santa - Secret Episode." The 2016 Christmas episode.
- "BSCC Special Christmas." The 2017 Christmas episode.
- "SVBB 001: Double Love." A pilot episode about the Sweet Valley High books.
- "BSCC: On Christmas Eve." The 2018 Christmas episode.
- "1998: The Podcast 001." A pilot episode of a show about pop culture from 1998. The episode includes material about The REM album Up, and the Buffy the Vampire Slayer season two finale "Becoming"
- "High Brow/Low Brow 001." A pilot episode of a show about highbrow culture versus lowbrow culture. The topics are The Waste Land by T. S. Eliot and Green Lantern comics.
- "The Baby-Sitters Club Movie." Discussion of The Baby-Sitters Club movie.
- "Daddy Eats Cat Food." Shepherd and Greenring explore ideas after finishing the Baby-Sitters Club Mysteries series.
- "The Lerangismas Episode." The 2019 Christmas episode.
- "BSCCD-ROM: The Baby-Sitters Club Friendship Kit." Shepherd and Greenring play the PC game "The Baby-Sitters Club Friendship Kit."
- "Two Men Play With Dolls." Shepherd and Greenring play with dolls they bought on EBay.

==== Patreon ====
The show has a related mini-show on Patreon, called The Baby Sitters Baby Elite, Elite Baby, Little Sister BIG Episodes, about the Baby-Sitters Little Sister series.

== Reception ==
Katie MacBride, writing for Bookriot, said, "Yes, Jack borders on being the annoying guy in Literary Theory 101 who came to class wearing a fedora and refused to refer to the book as anything other than 'the text.' I know, doesn't seem worth listening to on its own. But Tanner is the guy who came to that class solely so he can make fun of Jack and that is super worth listening to."

USA Today called the show "a bizarre premise that's wonderfully executed . . . It's roughly as productive as an actual book club, in that it includes a good amount of alcohol, very little discussion of the novel at hand and a ton of fun."

M.J. Franklin, writing for Mashable in 2018, said, "...what makes the show so hilarious are the many theories that Shepherd and Greenring generate about what's actually going on in the town of Stoneybrook. Is the Baby-Sitters Club marxist? And are the characters secretly in a parallel universe that's actually a beehive? Who knows, but after listening to this podcast, you won't be able to read The Baby-Sitters Club the same way again."

In September 2019, Muck Rack ranked the show 14th based on their number of unique visitors per month, with nearly 7 million.

In November 2019, the show was mentioned as an example in a New York Times article titled "Even Nobodies Have Fans Now (For Better Or Worse)". Lizz Schumer, writing for Good Housekeeping, listed the show among the 25 best comedy podcasts of 2020.
