= Thomas Bunn, Frome =

English diarist and philanthropist (1767–1853)

Thomas Bunn (1767–1853) was a British gentleman and philanthropist, who devoted his energies to improving his native town of Frome.

== The Bunn Family ==
William Bunn was a tallow chandler who had six children with his wife Joan between 1679 and 1689. His third son, Thomas (born 1684) became prosperous as a dyer, again having five children, of whom the three youngest died in childhood. The elder surviving son was James (1726-1759) who became a solicitor and steward to Sir Richard Bampfylde, but who died unexpectedly young. The younger son was Thomas (1729-1775) who became a doctor and apothecary. He had four children, Susannah (1762-1784), Thomas, Jane (1769-1862) and Arundel (1771-1845). He bought properties along Cork Street in 1757; there he built the substantial Monmouth House in 1770 and its stables, as well as other investments in the area. Portraits of James and Thomas may seen in the Frome Museum.

He died of fever when Thomas was nine.

My father gave, in addition to his medical advice, his money, his prayers, and in a cold wintry night left his great coat on the bed of a poor woman who had not sufficient covering. .... He sacrificed his life at the age of forty five, by attending at a wretched farmhouse, on a patient .... night after night. .... A short time before he died my mother said to him 'Shut your eyes my dear and endeavour to sleep'. He answered 'I think I ought to spend the small remainder of my time in contemplating those mysteries of saints and angels whom I hope soon to join'.

== Education and marriage ==
Thomas was educated at Kilmersdon School till he was nine. He then attended a school in Wells for three years before going to King Edward's School, Bath till he was fourteen. He entered the offices of an attorney in Chard to train as one, but found his tutor to have "not an idea beyond worldly objects" and employing him and the other staff 'like hired waiters in a manner which we could desire no improvement'. Aged 20, he joined chambers at Clement's Inn, but again found little instruction except by his own cramming.

His mother and sister, both named Jane, began a Sunday School from 1780 in Monmouth House: by 1785 there were 250,00 children enrolled across the country following the example of Robert Raikes in Gloucester. By 1831 it was a national movement, hosting 1.25m children.

Aged 34, Thomas married Rebecca Kelson at Beckington on 10 September 1801, witnessed by his mother Jane. He was practising as an attorney, carrying out diverse work in Frome, financially successful, but not to his own satisfaction: "His own repeated illnesses of myself, and my wife, intervened, and disabled me. I resigned my lucrative practice .... without having derived any advantage from it deserving of notice. During this time I did not sleep on roses. .... I felt too much anxiety to acquit myself well, and to serve my client, while I laboured for money". Sadly, he was barely married for two years when his wife died, possibly during childbirth; she was then 44.

== A public life ==
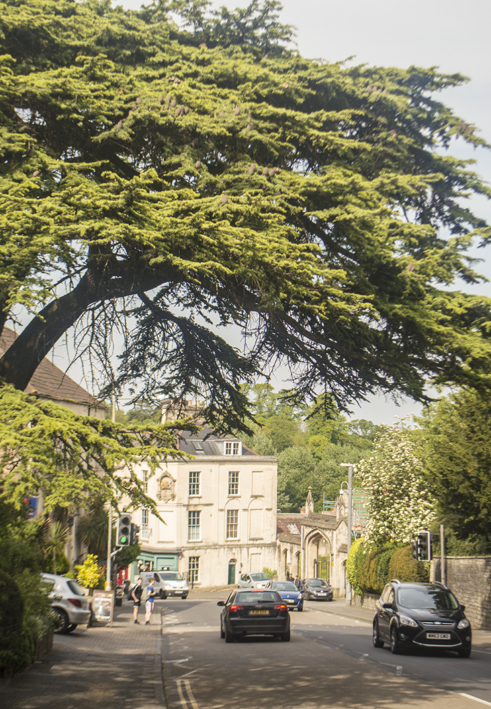
Bunn's surviving cypress in Bath Street, Frome

In 1797 he was one of the first to enrol in the Volunteer Corps of Infantry, in the rank of Captain; the purpose of the 120 Volunteers was "for the suppression of riots, within five miles of the town of Frome, or guard prisoners to the next town, or march to any part of the County of Somerset in case of actual invasion....". Thomas Champneys was the Colonel-Commandant, whom Bunn will come across in a later decade.

In 1810, £10,000 was raised for an act of Parliament which amended the rules of the Frome Turnpike Trust "for repairing Roads leading to and through the Town of Frome in the County of Somerset, and for paving the Footways and lighting the Streets within the said Town, and for removing Part of the present Market Place" This had been championed by Thomas Bunn. Prior to this the southern route out of town had been up Stony Street, turning left on to Palmer Street which then extended to the west front of the church of St John the Baptist, before turning up Gentle Street, a steep and constricted roundabout way, "narrow lanes which it was dangerous to pass when two carriages met". The new street involved the demolition of many tenements, including Anchor Barton and "such an accumulation of dung-heaps, slaughter-houses and tallow-melting houses as to be indescribable". The new wide carriageway modelled on Union Street, Bath established a new southern route running up from the Market Place. From 1811 terraces of well-built houses were built on either side. Some had classical pilasters which Bunn had insisted on. In 1814 a new west front and forecourt arch were designed by George IV's later architect, Jeffry Wyatville. Rook Lane Chapel was given a new frontage; it had previously been obscured by housing. The new road, Bath Street was named after the Marquess of Bath who owned many properties in the town and who lived at Longleat; Bunn had the Marquess's coat of arms installed high up on the diagonal face of No 8, on the left of the church's entrance way.

In 1821, just on the corner of his own street, then named Hill Street, and the Market Place, he persuaded the Earl of Cork & Orrery to build an Assembly Room above a covered market, in the style of Greek Revival architecture; in 1822, the street was renamed Cork Street. The Earl, who had a house at Marston Bigot Park, was shown by Bunn an image of the Roman Forum as 'a good design for a modern market-place'; the Earl demurred and 'thought of economy and said it would not pay'. Bunn's persuasion paid off; it remains one of Frome's notable buildings, now a bank with the ground floor enclosed.

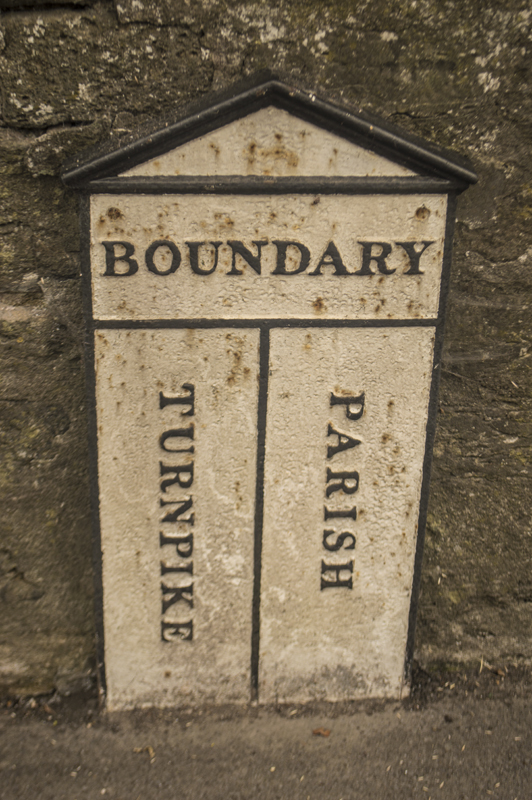
Roadside sign marking boundary between Parish and Turnpike Trust responsibility in Christchurch Road East, Frome, Somerset

As a member of the Frome Turnpike Trust, "my object has always been to improve the whole", he pursued the widening of the road across the south of the town from Badcox to Wallbridge, "forming more convenient thoroughfares, to give an increased value to numerous buildings": today this is Christchurch Road West, the junction with his new Bath Street, Christchurch Road East and Portway. In a similar way, Bunn proposed other improvements to the town, looking to Bath and its neoclassical architecture for inspiration. He wanted to see a great sweeping crescent of terrace houses 600 feet long on the hill above the town, a rival to Bath's Royal Crescent. He had constructed four stone gate piers to mark the entrance; it was never built. Only one which was part of his scheme stands in its original place along what had been called Behind Town and was known as Christchurch Road by 1830 after the church had been built in 1818. Another has been re-erected further along the street, though not in its original position. In 1822 on north side of Christchurch Road the South Parade was formed, cutting towards St Catherine's Hill; though it has some fine buildings and aligned with North Parade across the bridge to the north, it never became the striking thoroughfare he foresaw.

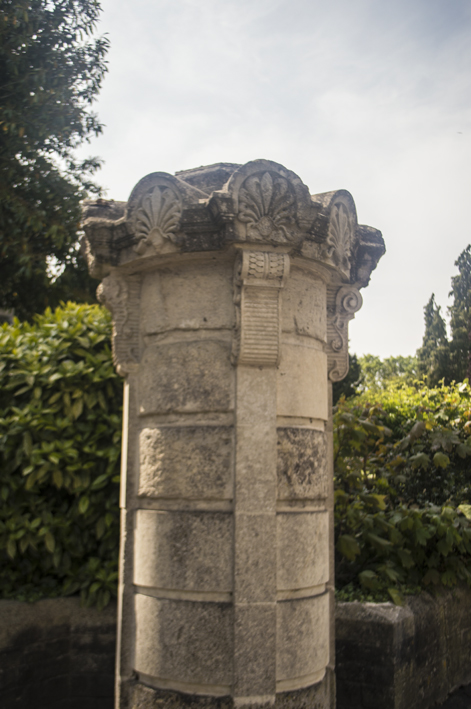
Bunn's pillar, marking one end of his proposed crescent

In 1839 he encouraged his fellow trustees of the Frome Turnpike Trust to build a new bridge at Welshmill, putting in his own money to make sure the bridge was thirty feet wide as recommended by an surveyor rather than the 25 feet the trustees agreed to pay. He was not sure that the arches were wide enough to prevent future flooding which proved to be the case.

Again in 1839 he paid for the repair of fences of shrubberies throughout the town: "I, who am comparatively poor, must either incur the expense or see the most pleasing objects which surround us in a state of neglect and ruin." In 1841 along Bath Street he paid for trees and shrubs to be planted - one of Bunn's stock still survives: a Cedar of Lebanon.

It was not until 1846 that the £10,000 raised by loan for Bath Street was repaid.

== Benevolence ==
"I believe my own slavery for five years [when articled as a solicitor in training] gave me a detestation of everything which bears the name. I adopted the principles of Mr Wilberforce. He had his secretary transcribe "sixteen anti-slavery petitions to be signed by the inhabitants of Frome, and the numerous societies who attend at different places of worship." In 1841 Thomas Bunn was a contributor to the British and Foreign Anti-Slavery Society. In the same year he and one of his sisters became subscribers to the same society.

Bunn supported the work of a wide and inclusive range of groups in Frome, sometimes by serving as a trustee, others by chairing or arranging meetings, providing funds and land, giving advice to individuals, checking accounts, introducing other patrons: the Labourer's Friends (allotments), Benefit Society, Bible Society, Blanket Fund, Blue House and Keyford Asylum, Church Missionary Society, Coal Fund, District Society, Fire Brigade, Mechanics Institute, Reading Society, Savings Bank, and Temperance Society.

He keenly wanted to create a Frome Literary Institution, based on his own membership of the Literary Institution in Bath. Rules and plans were drawn up. In 1845 a building in Palmer Street was occupied "where I found nothing but dirt and want of space for our collections, our lectures and our sub-librarian’s family, but such is the will of the majority." In October 1845 Bunn himself, then in his eighth year, gave a lecture to an audience of 300 on the subject: ‘The existence of God provided by the structure of the human mind’. Within a year he resigned his secretaryship and was unhappy with a proposal "to invite all the professional men in the town to give lectures without exception, not considering how many are disqualified from various causes." It was not until 1865 that the purpose-built Frome Literary and Scientific Institution was opened, under the direction of John Sinkins. This is now the Frome Museum.

Bunn set out from Monmouth House on a daily basis, followed by a crowd of beggars. He disliked making a display of his generosity: he walked with his hands behind his back, outstretched and with a gift in them. He never knew which beggar took the gift. He continued to provide legal advice to individuals from all work of life, always free of charge: a petition to allow a wife and children to join her transported husband in New South Wales, apprentice indentures, will disputes, debt distraints, charity applications, attempts of deception, domestic violence. "I have a numerous family twelve thousand adopted children, the population of this town." He commented freely on the cruel application of the law to the poor and of general social injustice: "I cannot pass over the infamy of persons with incomes of thousands of pounds yearly neglecting to pay their debts. To indulge their vices or their selfish pleasures they reduce families, widows and orphans to the lowest distress."

== Religion ==
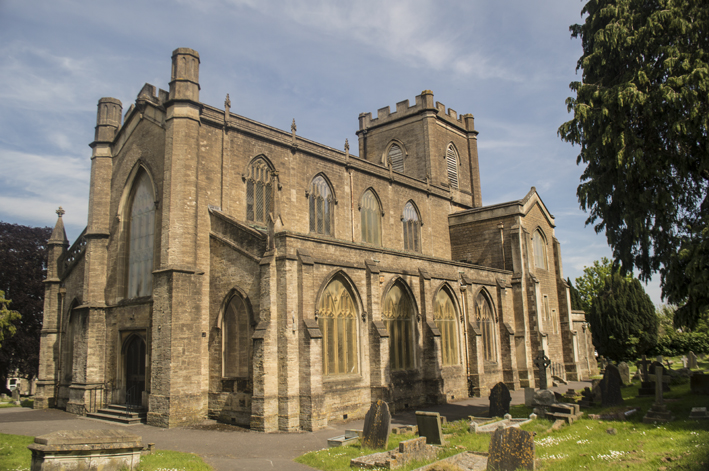
Christ Church, Frome, from the south-west

Bunn was brought up as a Baptist, his family attending the Sheppards Barton Church. He himself became a member of the Church of England. He was almost certainly involved in the building of Christ Church in 1818. As an adult he was baptised there in 1820. "The distinctions which caused dissent from the established church appeared to me frivolous." He encouraged the building of a new church in the growing western part of Frome; the construction of the free church of Trinity was begun in 1836 and completed in 1838. As secretary to the venture, Bunn prepared the contract and oversaw the schedule. In 1844 he organised a subscription for an organ and saw it installed. He was distressed by the upkeep of St John's churchyard, "kept in a slovenly, neglected state by a poor gravedigger who was not half paid for his labour". He sent his own gardeners to sort it out. He provided land for a non-conformist burial ground, though he commented: "Primitive Methodists .... Their views are narrow like most other peoples."

== Politics ==
Bunn had no public political life with one exception. He engaged with the great landowners of the area, the Marquess of Bath and the Earl of Cork and Orerry. In his diary he praised both for their generosity and their kindness towards ordinary people. Both were local magistrates and acted in his view with sympathy and "free of littleness".

The one exception was for Thomas Sheppard, whom he nominated as MP for Frome in 1832. An account of that election in Bunn's diary may be found here. The most cutting remarks in his diary were for Sheppard's opponent in that election, Champneys, a known slave-owner. Bunn had lent him a wheelchair in August 1839 "in the last extremity of illness". The baronet wrote him "a jocose letter not on his own infirmities but the infirmities of the wheel chair". After his death in November 1839, Bunn wrote "he contrived to make himself despised, and detested, and passed many years in a gaol [for bankruptcy and debt]. His person, and his beautiful residence, were avoided like the pestilence, except by a few of the most degraded of his species."

In the election of 1837, Bunn gave a public speech at the hustings supporting Sheppard. Like Bunn, Sheppard supported the Anti-Slavery movement and was a delegate for Frome at the British and Foreign Anti-Slavery Convention, at the Freemason's Hall, London, on 12 June 1834. He visited members of the extended Sheppard family, who also served with him as fellow trustees of the Almhouses, Blue School, and Keyford Asylum.

== Diary ==
Much of what we know of Bunn comes from his diary, 7 large volumes, beginning in August 1836 and ending in September 1850, with a gap between September 1846 and July 1850 when he was ill. It was private and personal, not intended for publication.

The Diary of an individual, like myself, is a mere record of common events, for his own reference and benefit, and is of no use, nor interest, to any other person, except the few who can desire instruction from the experience of others.

The diary is now in the possession of Frome Museum. It was examined by a local historian, Derek Gill, who edited and published in 2003 a selection of entries, organised into different aspects of his life.

The entries are characterised by his pleasures in the company of family and friends, in nature and classical architecture: "I am partial to an architectural ornament to a degree of imprudence. I prefer an appearance of good taste in building but I never recommend a shilling to be expended in ornament unless the money is first provided to pay for it." He describes his everyday life as a round of committees, inspections, garnering subscriptions, advising. He seems to be tireless in his pursuit of charitable work: "an unoccupied hour I have never known". At the same time he constantly inveighs against those who waste public money, who do not follow up on contractors' work and spend more than funds allow, against those who cheat others by failing to pay what they owe, against the cruelties of the law, against injustices to the poor, against the time he wasted in his youth. Entry after entry reveals his frustration and anguish. Yet there is no hint that he ever made these acerbic assertions in public. If he spoke on a subject but lost the debate, he always accepted and proceeded with the majority decision: "I did not interfere".

== Demise of the Bunn family ==
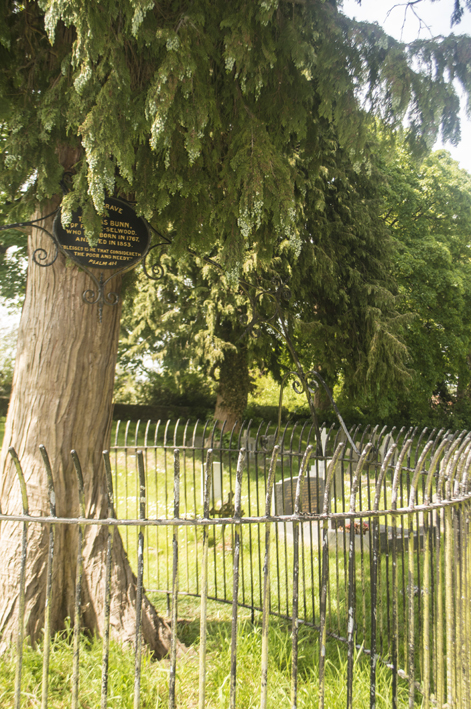
Bunn's plot in Christ Church graveyard

He never remarried but lived with his sister and mother at Monmouth House. His younger sister, Arundel lived in her own property in Bristol, "the best economist and the best reader in the family"; she died in 1845 aged 74 after a long series of debilitating illness. When Bunn died on 15 May 1853 aged 86, it was his wish that Monmouth House be given to the Frome Literary Institution, but his will of 85 pages of multiple bequests was so complicated it was set aside. It was his wife's family, the Kelsons, his nearest surviving relations who eventually inherited his estate. His sister, Jane died in 1862 aged 93 and was buried in Sheppards Barton Baptist Church, near to her father, mother and sister. Bunn was buried in Christ Church burial ground.

He was so far ahead of his time that some of his ideas are only now fashionable - such as the provision of playgrounds and open spaces, and the widening of roads. .... he remains as the supreme example in the history of Frome of the man who points the way to the future and so contributes to the development of the community which he adorned.

== Afterword ==
His epitaph in Christ Church aptly sums up his life:

In his native place he was the active

and liberal promoter of all architectural

and other improvements.

"Whatever he touched, he adorned."

To charitable and useful institutions

of every kind he lent his willing aid.

To the poor and friendless,

he was through a long life, the unwearied friend.

Note: The text on the plaque was written in block capitals. The quotation in the epitaph is a version in English of Samuel Johnson's epitaph on William Goldsmith: 'Nullum quod tetigit non ornavit'.

Thomas Bunn and his mother and sister were in the habit of coming out of Monmouth House into the stable yard, across the lane that ran on the far side of the stables. Then they would walk up the steep winding path through the allotments .... to a little garden at the top. Close under the high wall that backed on to the gardens of Catherine Street he would sit in a little alcove looking out on the far side of the valley. His diaries talk of scents and blossoms, fruits and flowers.

In 2000 a Millennium project was proposed "to replace his hillside walk with a water-powered funicular railway" to run from Cork Street, conveying passengers up to St Catherine Hill, taking 200 passengers an hour in both directions, with facilities to accommodate wheelchairs. It sought to restore Monmouth House and its gardens, converting the Monmouth House stables into a bistro cafe, adding a nursing home and commercial units and incorporate the octagonal Sunday School next to the former United Reform Chapel. The Thomas Bunn Railway Project was costed at £950,000 as a tourism-boosting initiative. Though supported by Mendip District Council and the local MP, it never came to fruition.

His name is commemorated in a newly named small residential development on the Bath Road (one of the roads for which he was responsible as a key member of the Frome Turnpike Trust): Thomas Bunn Close BA11 2RX.
