= International Society for Clinical Densitometry =

Society for clinical densitometry

- Founded: 1993
- Location: Middletown, Connecticut, United States
- Fields: Medicine; Densitometry
- Key people: George Helmrich (President)
- Website: iscd.org

International Society for Clinical Densitometry (ISCD) is a professional community of physicians with more than 2,700 individual members from over 25 countries. The society advocated an advance in the assessment of musculoskeletal health through education, certification and facility accreditation. The association is established in 1993 and headquartered in Middletown, Connecticut, United States.

== Conferences ==
The International Society for Clinical Densitometry periodically hosts both Annual Meetings and Position Development Conferences (PDC). The Annual Meetings are held in demonstration of Society's mission of "advancing high-quality musculoskeletal health assessments in the service of superior patient care".

The purpose of the Position Development Conferences is to gather experts in the field of skeletal measurement and update the Society’s Official Positions, which pertain to the use of bone mass measurement and other skeletal health assessment technologies inclusive of the performance, interpretation, reporting, and clinical relevance of those technologies. The Official Positions are intended to serve as guidance to the field of osteoporosis assessment and as a foundation for elements of the ISCD’s education, certification, and facility accreditation activities. The positions are disseminated in official ISCD publications and widely cited peer-reviewed literature. The first adult PDC was held in July 2001.

== Former presidents ==
- Sanford Baim
- John Bilezikian
- Neil Binkley
- Robert Blank
- John Carey
- Didier Hans
- David Kendler
- Diane Krueger
- Andrew Laster
- William Leslie
- Michael Lewiecki
- Paul Miller
- Sarah Morgan
- Steven Petak
- John Schousboe
- John Shepherd
- Christopher Shuhart
- S. Bobo Tanner
- Nelson Watts

== Sister organizations ==
- American Association of Endocrine Surgeons (AAES)
- American Diabetes Association (ADA)
- American Society for Bone & Mineral Research (ASBMR)
- American Society of Andrology (ASA)
- American Society of Endocrine Physician Assistants (ASEPA)
- American Society for Reproductive Medicine (ASRM)
- American Thyroid Association (ATA)
- Androgen Excess and PCOS Society (AE-PCOS)
- Association of Program Directors in Endocrinology (APDEM)
- Endocrine Nurses Society (ENS)
- American Association of Clinical Endocrinologists (AACE)
- Juvenile Diabetes Research Foundation (JDRF)
- Pediatric Endocrine Society (PES)
- Pediatric Endocrinology Nursing Society (PENS)
- Society for Behavioral Neuroendocrinology (SBN)
- Society for Gynecologic Investigation (SGI)
- Society for the Study of Reproduction (SSR)
- Endocrine Society (ES)
- The Obesity Society (TOS)
- The Pituitary Society (PS)

== Publications ==
- Journal of Clinical Densitometry
