= John Webb Singer =

English industrialist (1819–1904)

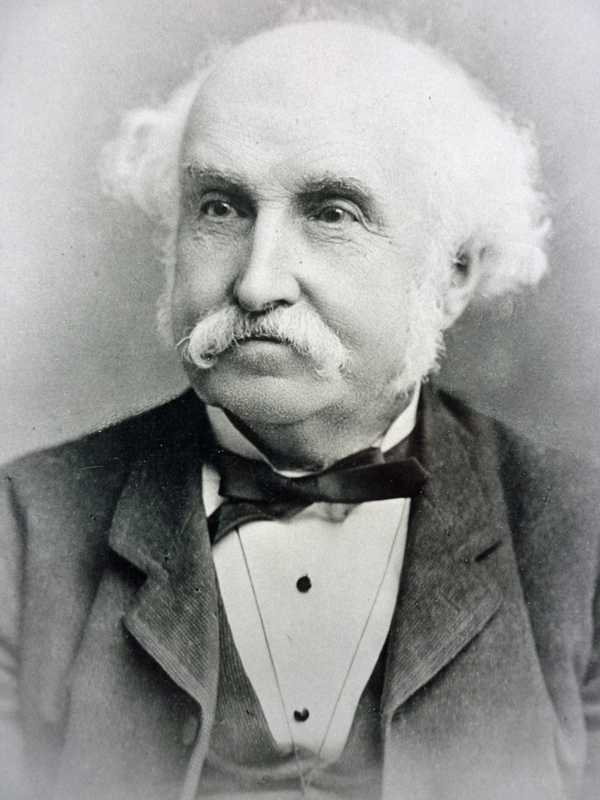
J W Singer

John Webb Singer (23 February 1819 – 6 May 1904) was an English businessman who created a substantial art foundry in Frome, Somerset, known for its statuary and ecclesiastical products. He had assembled immense collections of antique jewellery, rings, wine glasses, snuffboxes, stamps. He took a prominent part in both local and national politics, serving on the Local Board and its successor the Urban District Council, founding the Frome Art School and helping to create the Frome Literary and Scientific Institution (now the Frome Museum). He worked with the leading bronze sculptors of his day.

== Early life ==
John Webb Singer was born in Frome, Somerset, the only son of Joseph Singer by his second wife. Joseph was an architect and builder, though he was listed as a mason at his son's birth, living in the Butts, and as a carpenter on a daughter's birth in 1820. John Webb was named after his uncle, a farmer at Roddenberry near Longleat, who had been murdered six years before.

John's father died when the boy was 3, leaving his widowed mother destitute with six children. His family were not well off, and John Singer was educated at the Frome Blue Coat Charity School, as a ‘hat boy’. This meant he was of charity status, educated at the expense of the trustees. Opposite his family home in the Butts, Frome was a foundry for casting bells. He made an unsuccessful attempt to cast a toy cannon in iron, but failing that made it of lead.

In 1834, he was apprenticed for five years to a local watchmaker, Thomas Pitt. He managed his employer's business in Eagle Lane, just off Bath Street, and took it over in his own right as a watchmaker, clockmaker and jeweller in 1848.

== The first metalwork ==
In October 1843, he married Arabella Kenwood in Frome. They had a son, Kenwood John, who died in infancy. In September 1846 they had a daughter, Ellen Mabel (1846-1936). His wife Arabella died In February 1848. Later in 1848 Singer was asked by a local vicar to make a pair of candlesticks. In 1851 Singer attended the Great Exhibition and observed the range of products and styles available. He already had some of his own elaborate and decorative designs on display.

In that same year he moved into 25 Market Place, a larger and more public display for his watchmaking business. At the same time it provided workshops for his church work and living quarters for himself and soon afterwards his family. The name 'Singer' is still visible, engraved on the window above the door lintel. He soon established two forges in nearby Justice Lane and more workshops in Eagle Lane just behind no 25.

In January 1852 he married Sarah Doswell from nearby Beckington. Between 1853 and 1862, they had three children, sons Walter Herbert and Edgar Ratcliffe and daughter Amy Mary. In that same period of his family life, his business expanded greatly.

He gained a major contract with the Reverend J W E Bennett, who had taken over the parish church of St John the Baptist in 1852, which was then in a state of disrepair. The two men both favoured ornate church décor in the Gothic Revival style that originated with the Oxford Movement and Pugin. Singer's craftsmen were kept busy on this contract for four years; much of their brass is still in the church today. Large altar crosses they produced may be seen elsewhere in the cathedral churches of Madras, Ripon, Gloucester and Salisbury. Singer's obituary in the Somerset Standard in 1904 stated that more than 600 churches were lit by candle, oil and gas, including Bristol Cathedral, on fixtures from his foundry.

In 1866, Singer acquired a new permanent site for a factory in Cork Street, where he set up a new furnace and recruited craftsmen from Belgium, France and Switzerland. He re-introduced into England the process of repoussé. Among these new recruits were sand-moulders; their skills were initially deployed in castings for the ecclesiastical side of the business. They proved invaluable when statuary was requested that required sand-casting.

"Mr J W Singer, of the Market Place, Froome, has been engaged, for the last twelve years, in the manufacture of medieval metal work, in silver, brass, and iron, which has been principally employed for ecclesiastical purposes. Nearly one hundred places of worship and other public edifices have been supplied by him......Hundreds of candlesticks, etc., of exquisite workmanship, have been sent to Oxford alone, where they are extensively used in the Colleges. Mr Singer is at present engaged in manufacturing enamelled medieval jewellery in silver....From fifteen to twenty hands are generally employed....The articles mostly manufactured are altar-rails and standards, gates, and candlesticks....The great merit of Mr Singer's productions is the variety and taste of his designs, all of which are the result of his own genius...."

On one occasion a local, titled lady brought back some brasswork from Italy and inquired Singer of its antiquity. He replied “Only about five or six months”. It had been cast in his foundry and sent to Italy.

He travelled extensively on the continent throughout his working life, partly to add to his magpie collections of jewellery, partly to study alternative techniques and designs. His work was shown at international exhibitions to general acclaim: Paris 1855, Manchester 1857, London 1862, Paris 1867, London 1871 and 1872.

In 1864, he founded the Frome Art School, using his own home for the first classes, and visiting the South Kensington Art Schools in London for guidance on syllabus and exams. He wanted to apprentice pupils from the Frome Blue Coat School, as he needed artist craftsmen, skilled in creative design and not just in mechanical production. The project ultimately failed under economic pressures; he was innovating well in advance of the Arts & Crafts Movement under the leadership of Morris and Ruskin. In 1902 his educational foresight led to the School of Art and Science, built in Park Road, which ultimately formed the core of the later Technical College.

== Public service ==
Singer was much engaged in public service. He enrolled in the Frome Volunteers in 1860, when a war with France seemed likely. He served for twenty years and became a Colour Sergeant. He was a Trustee of the Frome Charities. He was elected to the Local Board in 1882 and again in 1888. At the Keyford Asylum, he donated money for girls of good character to receive a marriage portion. As a former pupil of the Blue School, he gave money for boys to learn swimming at the newly opened Victoria Jubilee Public Baths. He wrote articles for the local newspapers on the lives and deeds of leading people of his day and in the past: he called them 'Frome Worthies'.

== In the family ==
All three children from his second marriage went to the South Kensington Art Schools, studying under the sculptor, Jules Dalou. Walter Herbert (1853-1922) was awarded a travelling scholarship from the Goldsmiths Company and won several prizes: Paris 1878, London 1881 and Melbourne 1881. Edgar Radcliffe (1857-1947), his second son, kept a sketchbook of work he had seen in the South Kensington Museum, today known as the Victoria and Albert Museum, from which he created many designs in work at the foundry. His daughter, Amy Mary Singer (1862-1941) created the Digby Memorial in Sherborne, Dorset: this is an ornate stone cross with four bronze figures of St Aldhelm, Bishop Roger, Abbot Bradford and Walter Raleigh.

She studied further in Paris at the Académie Colarossi. Amy shared a studio with Camille Claudel, who came to stay with the Singer family in Frome in 1886. They studied with Boucher and later with Rodin, who was Amy and Camille's patron. He gave them lessons and critiqued their work. A letter from Singer to Rodin is in the Musee Rodin archive thanking him for this. A photo exists of Claudel and the Singer family outside North Hill Cottage, where the family lived from the early 1880s. Amy Singer exhibited five times at the Royal Academy Summer Exhibition from 1882 - 1887, mostly in terracotta, the last being a bust of her future father-in-law. In 1889 in St John's Church Amy married Fountain Elwin, who had exhibited a sculpture at the RA. He was a direct descendant of Pocahontas, a Native American woman, and John Rolfe, an English colonist in Virginia.

== Monumental works ==
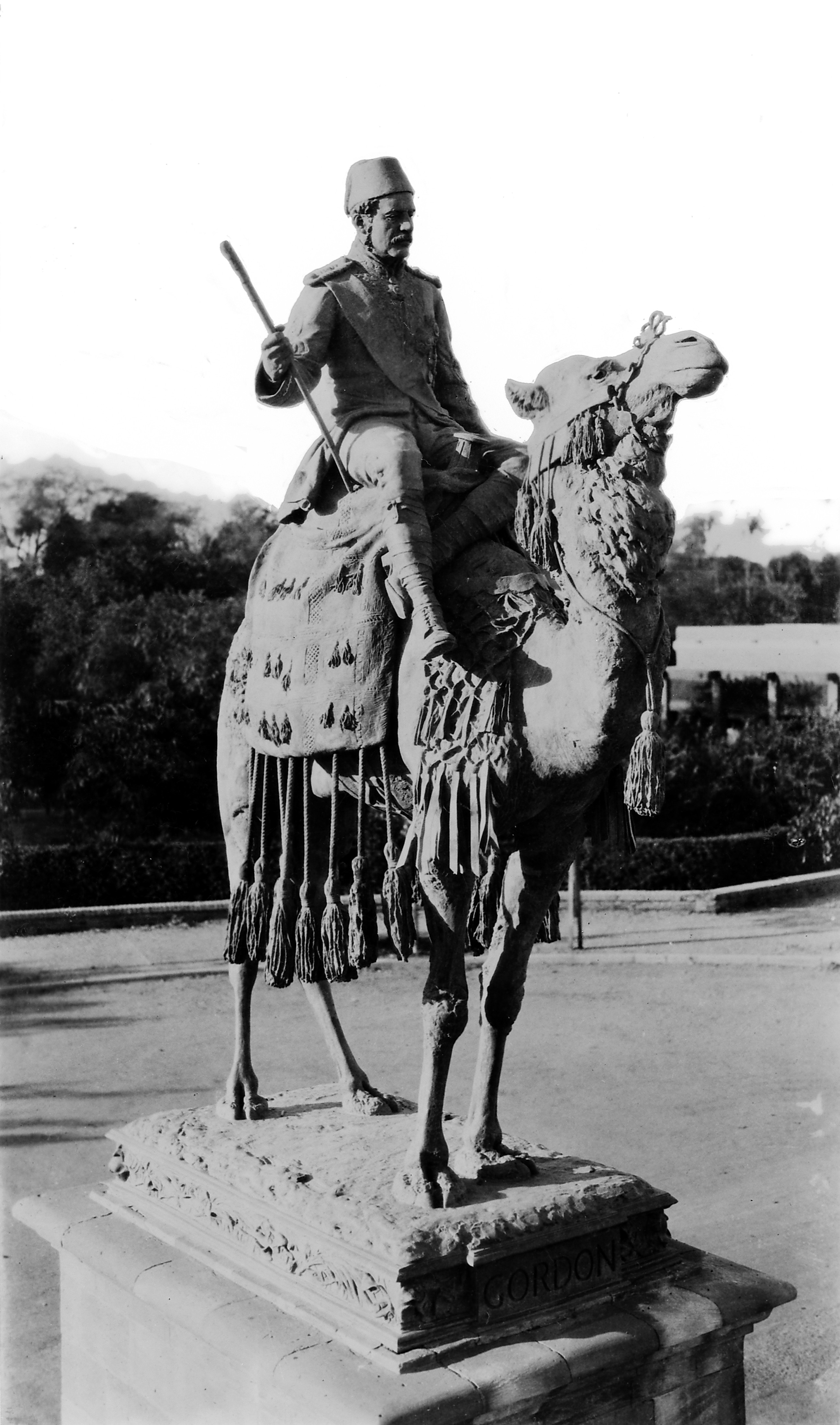
Onslow Ford's statue of General Gordon seated on a camel

In 1888 Singer was invited to attend a meeting of leading sculptors, including Hamo Thornycroft, Onslow Ford and Thomas Brock, who were concerned about the quality of work of British foundries compared with those of France or Belgium. He told them he had recently added a new statue area to his existing works. He was capable of creating large sand castings. Critically he could offer the 'lost wax' or cire perdue method of casting which was needed for detail - a method then almost unknown in England - which he had learned from the continent and from the craftsmen he had brought to Frome. This method of reproduction allowed for fine delineation of faces and hands as well as feature work. Almost immediately his order book expanded.

Thornycroft asked Singer to cast a panel for a statue of General Gordon destined for Melbourne. This was exported in March 1889. Singer then cast a large equestrian statue by Hems of William III for the Clifton Street Orange Hall in Belfast. Even taller was a statue of General Gordon on a camel, an ambitious project which necessitated raising the roof of the workshop. Thereafter it was known as the 'Camel Shed'. Onslow Ford created the plaster form; it had highly complex elements: a refined face, ornamented jacket, a rattan cane, intricate saddlebag tassels and the camel's harness, all requiring the 'lost wax' method. It stands at Brompton Barracks in Chatham. A copy by another bronze founder once stood in Khartoum; shortly after Sudan achieved its independence, the statue was removed and reinstalled at Gordon's School, near Woking in 1959.

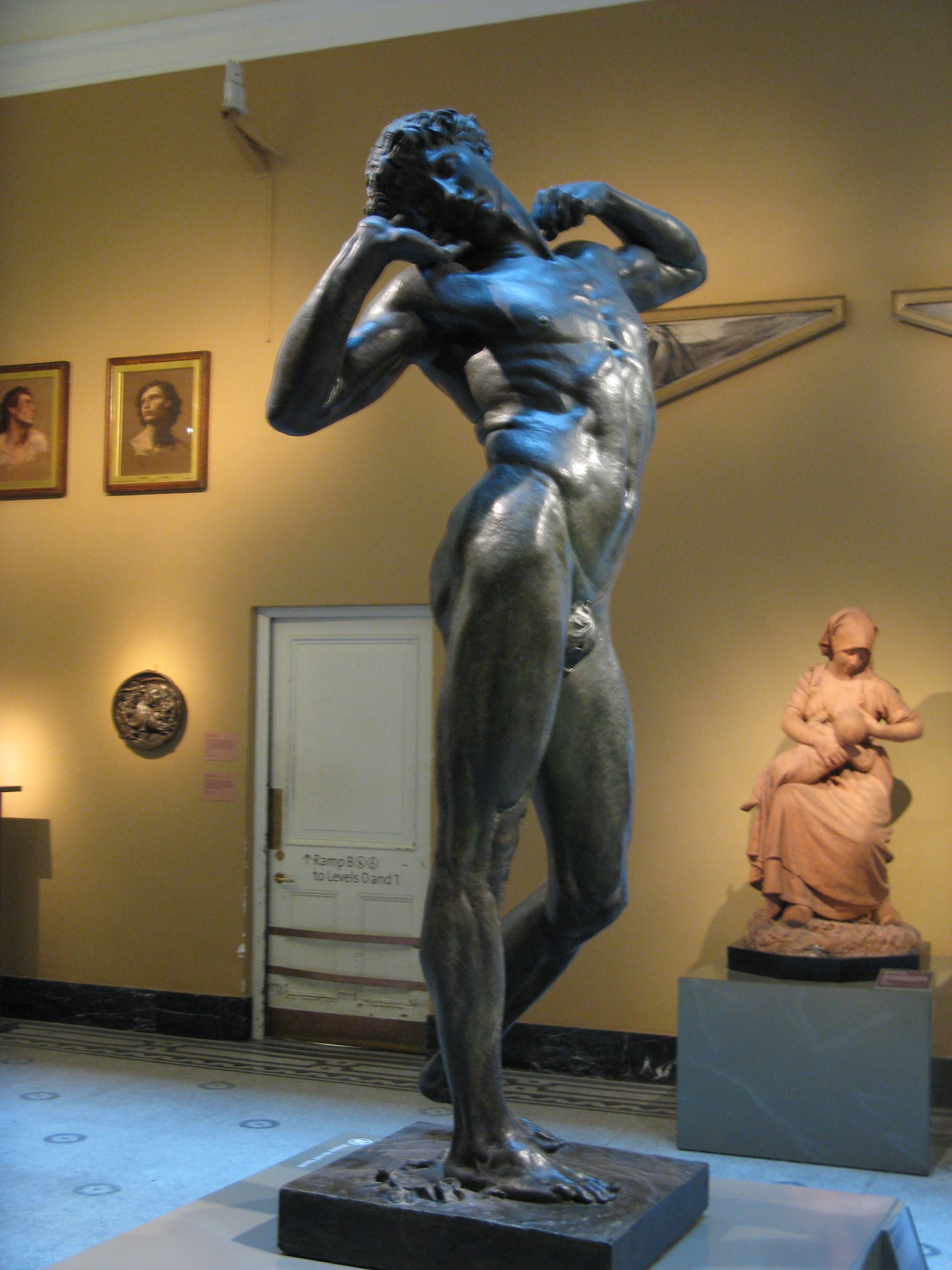
Frederic Lord Leighton: "The Sluggard", Victoria and Albert Museum

"The Sluggard" by Frederic Leighton became very important for Singer. A life-sized bronze, also known as "Athlete awakening from sleeping", was first exhibited in 1886 at the Royal Academy. From 1890 Singer produced reduced-scale versions in bronze, organised by Arthur Collie, one of the first people to sell reductions of large works. It became one of the most reproduced statuettes of the time; it was still in the Singer trade catalogue of 1914.

Brock's statue of Richard Owen (1895) still occupies a space in the Natural History Museum that Owen created; once in the Main Hall, it was moved in 2009 to accommodate one of Darwin, his scientific rival.

Another major statue was that of "Cromwell", again by Thornycroft, placed outside the Palace of Parliament. Singer delivered the statue on time in 1898, but the then Prime Minister, Lord Roseberry delayed the unveiling till the following year, concerned about demonstrations. Instead, it proved to be exceptionally popular. Then Thornycroft's massive statue of "King Alfred" was unveiled in Winchester for the millennial commemoration of his death, 17 foot high from the base to the top of his arm.

"Boadicea and her Daughters", Singer's most well-known piece has a complex history. The project was begun back in 1850 by Thornycroft's father, Thomas. By 1870 it was largely complete, special attention being paid to the outlines, avoiding drapery that would confuse the outline at a distance. Both Hamo Thornycroft and his mother, Mary also worked on it. His father died in 1885. When the London County Council decided to open the supposed tumulus of her burial on Parliament Hill in 1894, Thornycroft proposed that a statue be erected on the site, submitting his father's plaster model as evidence:

"I should like to point out that the group is not only a monument to Boadicea, but also to 'British pluck', which in this group is shown with so much force as to appeal at once to all who examine it.....My father's group has a tale to tell to men unborn....".

At first Thornycroft contributed £100 to the estimated cost of £6000. In the end he paid £2000 for the whole casting by Singer. When the Society of Antiquaries rejected the tumulus as Boadicea's burial place, a new site was proposed on the Embankment, on the south-west end of Westminster Bridge where the statue stands today, after the final assembly on site in 1902.

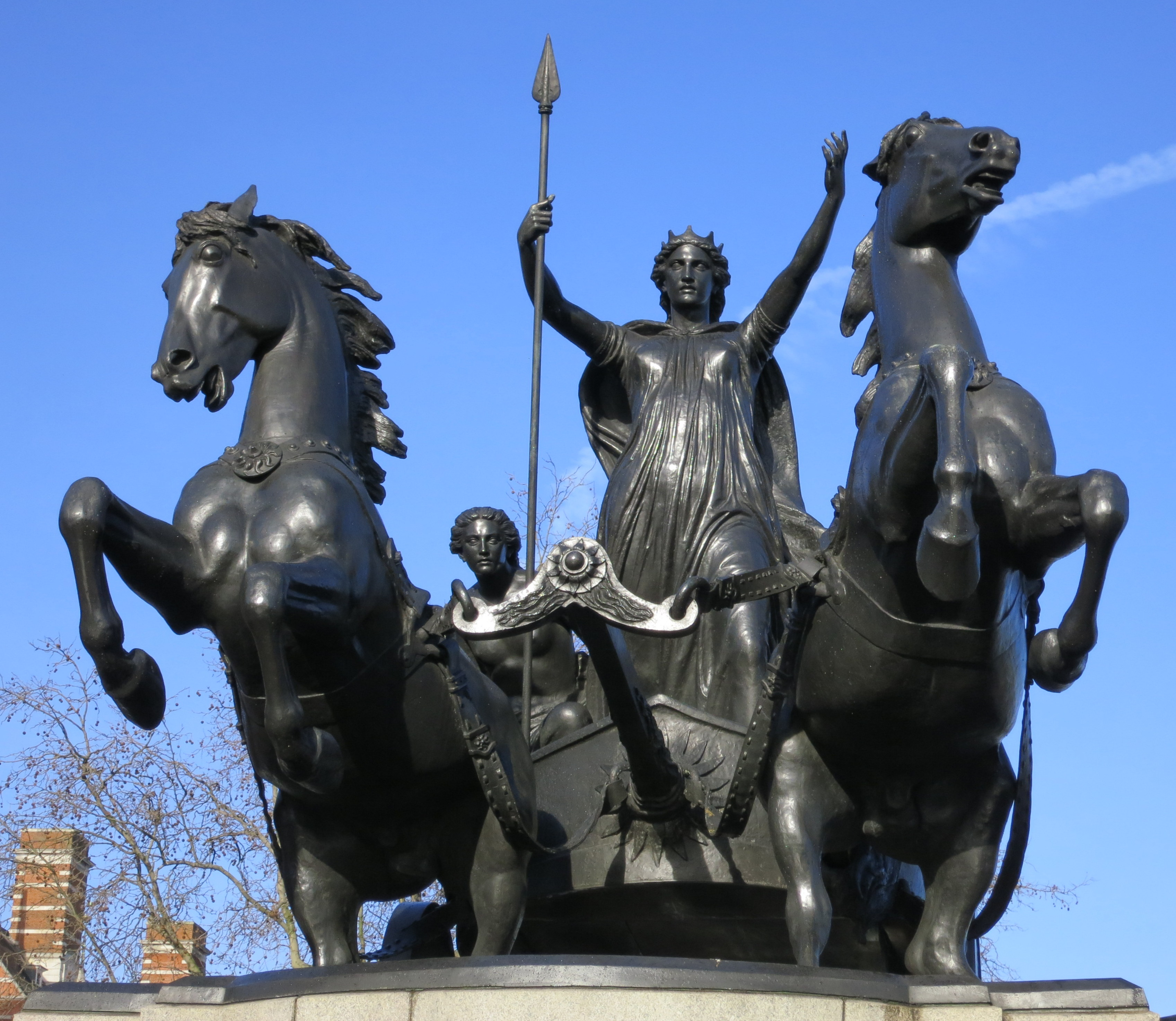
Boadicea and her Daughters, cast by J. W. Singer & Sons

The Iceni queen is now more properly named Boudica, or Boudicca as Tacitus wrote her name, rather than Boadicea. This was a complex piece for Singer: Boudica herself with a spear, her other arm upraised, two crouching daughters with bared breasts, two horses reinless, a chariot, scythes on both wheels. As part of Queen Victoria's Jubilee celebrations in 1897, Albert Parrott, a manager at Morris Singer, recalled his memories as a nine year old in Frome:

"I was fascinated by the team of five horses trying to pull the bronze casting of one of the horses up the steep incline leading from the centre of the town......On a wagon in the same procession one of the casters from the J. W. Singer & Sons foundry was busy pouring molten zinc into a steel die carrying an impression of Her Majesty to produce medallions. The die was mounted on a platform.....as fast as the medals were poured, down came the guillotine to cut off the runners. The medals slid down a chute at the back of the wagon, the natives of Frome burning their hands scrambling for them as souvenirs."

== Collections ==
J W Singer was a phenomenal collector of all kinds of things: rare and antique jewellery (15 collections in total, three of which he gave to the South Kensington Museum, now the Victoria and Albert Museum), rings (some 400 from 17th - 18th centuries), wine glasses (700+), snuffboxes, stamps, china, pottery, bookplates, chatelaines. He had a fine collection of cacti, winning a prize in 1894 at the Royal Horticultural Society for a display of 160 plants.

The V & A have examples from the jewellery collection he bequested to them, and examples of metalwork that they bought from him on display in the Jewellery and Metalwork galleries (the metalwork is older and not cast by Singer's but from his collection). Apart from "The Sluggard" (see illustration above), the V & A have three fine examples of products from his workshops: an alms dish, a wall sconce designed by Herbert and Edgar and a large brass pricket candlestick; these are not currently on display, except in the online catalogue.

== Legacy ==
After the death of J W Singer in 1904 at Knoll House in Gentle Street, his two sons, Herbert and Edgar took charge of the firm, under the continuing and colourful chairmanship of William Bull. The statuary work continued, including noteworthy castings: Thornycroft's "Gladstone" in the Strand, Pomeroy's "Justice" on the Old Bailey, Fehr's fantastical Welsh Dragon on the top of Cardiff's City Hall and eight large lions for the Cecil Rhodes Memorial in Cape Town, South Africa. 150 lion's head bronze mooring rings, designed by Gilbert Bayes, were installed in 1910 along the Thames Embankment beside the County Hall. Other works include "Hampden" in Aylesbury (1912) marking the Civil War, and gates at the Bowes Museum and Cliveden.

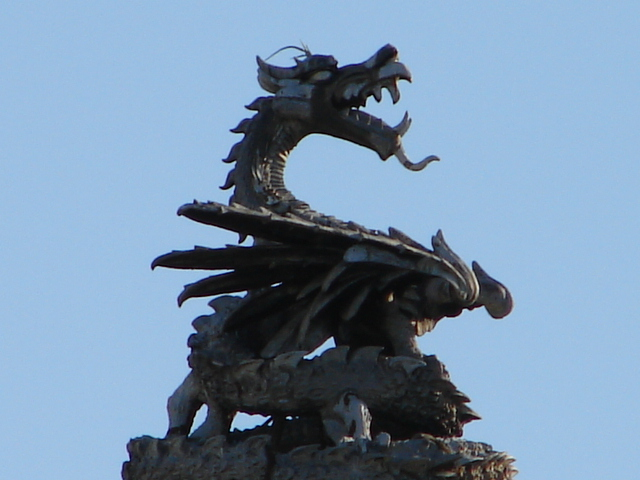
Fehr's Welsh dragon on Cardiff City Hall

Church work fell away during this period, fashions were changing. In 1914 Singer & sons amalgamated with a rival, Spital & Clark of Birmingham. Herbert and Edgar Singer took back seat positions on the board, still chaired by William Bull, knighted in 1905, MP for Hammersmith. Statuary production was put on hold; the company struggled.

In July 1915, after Lloyd George became Minister of Munitions, contracts were won to support the war effort. New equipment was brought in. From July 1916 to December 1918, the work force grew to 700 men and women. The firm produced 1.6 million shell cases plus 71.5 million .303 cartridges plus gun mountings, parts for aeroplane engines, fuze body stampings and submarine mines, 23,400 tons of metal.

After WWI, with a reduced staff, orders for metal stampings, wrought iron work, war memorials, ecclesiastical metalwork and statuary resumed. All kinds of bronze work were in demand from home and abroad: statues, wreathes, emblems, friezes, tablets, as well as entrance doors and revolving doors for the Hong Kong & Shanghai Bank in Shanghai, lift enclosures for flats in Brook Street, London, lighting standards for Reading Bridge and the gates for Africa House in Kingsway, London. Two of the largest commissions were Fehr's 1924 Shanghai Allied War Memorial (the Angel and all of the other bronzes were removed by the Japanese in 1943) and friezes for the Scottish National War Memorial (1927) at Edinburgh Castle by Alice Meredith Williams. Among the many monuments Singer & Sons created were Thornycroft's "Peace" in Luton, Fehr's Keighley memorial with its rare depiction of a sailor and the simple infantryman at Trowbridge by Bentham, typical of many war memorials cast by Singer & Sons: "beauty of design, appropriateness and excellence of execution".

During the 1920s, Singer & Sons lost some trade and craftsmen to a new business, Morris Art Bronze Foundry in Lambeth. From May 1927 the statuary and art metalwork side of Singers was gradually transferred to London, along with some craftsmen, under a financial arrangement, to create the Morris Singer Company, which moved to Basingstoke in 1967.

During WWII, the factory switched to making war material. The firm took over the old Cockey gas works at Welshmill to produce metal brass rods for making fuse bodies. Jim Garrett, as an apprentice, observed:

I went to work at Singers, that would have been about 1943...The siren would go, and we all had to move somewhere else in case they dropped a few bombs, or something. But, in the event, it didn't happen, so they abandoned that idea, because it stopped the production. Making shell-noses...for the army.

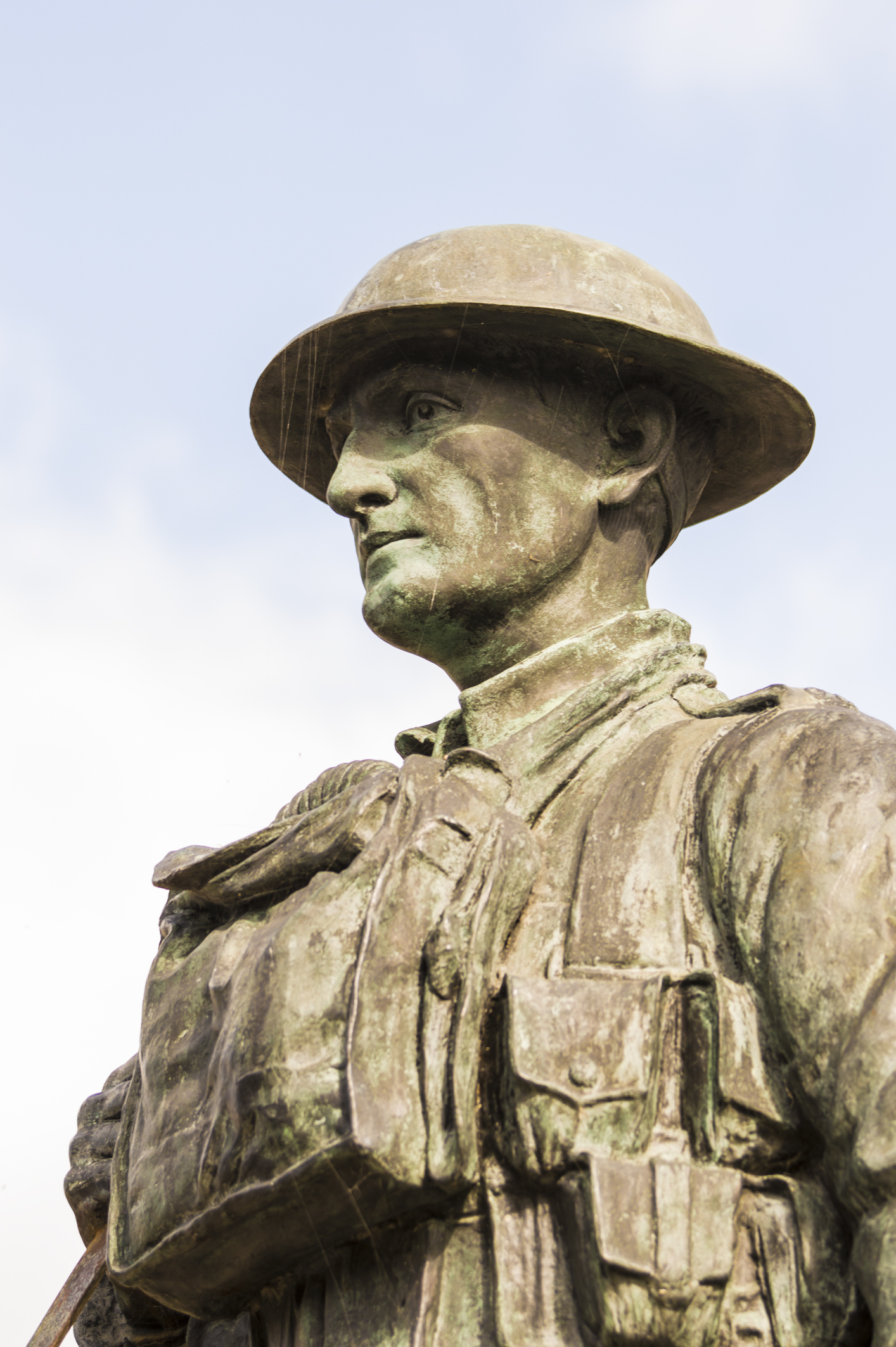
Charlie Robbins: detail from Frome's Servicemen Memorial, cast by Singer & Sons

Metal stampings continued in Frome. The company was absorbed by the Delta Metal Group in 1956. In 2000 production was relocated to Handlemaker Road in Frome and the old site was sold for housing. The factory now concentrates on water sprinklers for fire protection in the ownership of Tyco.

== Singer in Frome today ==
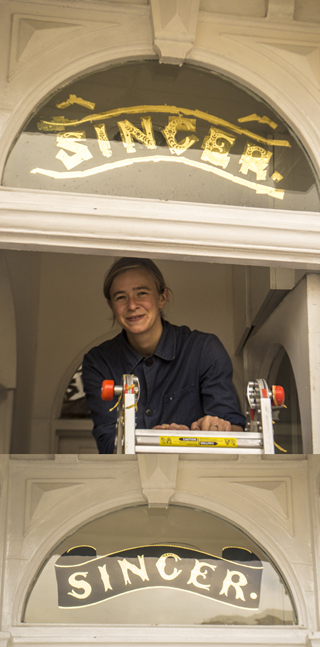
Re-gilding the sign at 25 Market Place, Singer's workplace and home; Camilla Rose, traditional sign writer & gilder, top; new sign completed, below

The work of the foundry can be seen in several different locations. The Frome Museum has window balustrades and metal banister supports on the interior cantilever or torsion staircase of 1865–9. His house at 25 Market Place has window balustrades on the first floor. In 2019 the original sign above the door lintel was re-gilded, funded by the Frome Society for Local Study. The Church of St John the Baptist has a brass screen to the chancel and a forged metal one to the Lady Chapel. There is a brass lectern and brass candlesticks in the church, but it is uncertain that these are Singer products; he did make such items for the church, but there has been some clearance of excess Victorian items. The Holy Trinity Church has a rood screen installed in 1903–06, now repositioned in a chapel to one side. New gates for the Blue House were provided by the Singer company in 1994 in response to an appeal by the trustees; a plaque is placed on the wall to the left of the entrance.

A Singer's Trail has been created: a walk round key sites related to J W Singer and his foundry, in the 200th anniversary year of his birth. Information boards have been placed at several locations along the trail. A leaflet is available from Frome Town Hall, Frome Museum or the Discover Frome Information Point. In July 2019 'Casting the World: the story of J W Singer & Sons, Frome' was published as part of the town's celebrations; this includes newly discovered photographs of the workshops. In November 2019 a plaque from the Frome Society for Local Study was installed on the Old Courthouse, Waterloo, where Singer established his Frome Art Metalworks in 1866.

On 3 August 2014 a memorial to Frome Servicemen was installed outside the Memorial Theatre, opposite the Town Hall on Christchurch Road West. This is dedicated to the fallen of WWI, WWII and the Falklands conflict. The statue on the memorial is a lifesize cast of Charlie Robbins, an employee of Singer both before his enlistment in WWI and after his demobilisation. He retired from Singer in the late 1950s and died in 1981 aged 89. The plaster was modelled by Edgar Thomas Earp and cast in 1922. After being rediscovered in the late 1970s/early 1980s, it was placed in front of the Singer Factory in Waterloo, close to the centre of the town. In 1999, while the factory was being relocated, the statue was sent to Morris Singer in Basingstoke to have its rifle strap and other elements repaired or added. On its return it was placed outside what became the Tyco site in Handlemaker Road, till it was gifted to serve as the memorial on a 99-year lease to Frome Town Council. It is the only statue cast by Singer that never really left Frome.
