= FromeFM =

England
- Broadcast area: Frome, surrounding area and online
- Frequency: 96.6 MHz

Programming
- Format: Community radio

Ownership
- Owner: Frome Community Productions CIC (Company Registration Number – 06585776, Community Radio Station ID – CR230)

History
- First air date: 16 June 2012 (current format)

Links
- Webcast: stream
- Website: www.frome.fm

FromeFM is a non-profit community radio station in Frome, Somerset, England. It is run by Frome Community Productions CIC and produced by over 80 volunteers. It broadcasts around 65 new programmes per month 24/7 online and on 96.6 MHz FM. FromeFM provides niche music programmes; Frome focussed debates and reportage; sustained support for and coverage of the work of community groups; and radio for children.

== History ==
Frome FM started life as a small project back in 2005 at Frome Community College. It was resurrected in 2007 by Phil Moakes who, with the help of a small team of volunteers, produced and created varied radio programmes both online and on FM with a restricted service licence and broadcast from the attic of the Cheese and Grain.

In May 2008, FromeFM was established by Frome Community Productions CIC and moved into premises at The Old Fire Station where the station underwent significant upgrades with the help of fundraisers and sponsors.

In September 2009, FromeFM launched FFM – streaming service for mobile phones – to enable listeners to tune in whilst on the move. In 2012, Frome FM was granted a permanent licence by Ofcom to broadcast on 96.6 FM from a transmitter placed on top of the Memorial Theatre a short distance away. A launch event was attended by many local celebrities including actor Mark McGann, folk singer Cara Dillon and musician Sam Lakeman.

In December 2016 FromeFM moved into temporary accommodation into one of the old prison cells at The Old Police House, also in Christchurch Street West.

In April 2017, the station was awarded a 5-year extension to its license from Ofcom and moved its studios again to join local community groups and Frome Town Council in the newly refurbished Town Hall on Christchurch Street West. The studio space was created within a large room on the first floor of the building, from where the team of volunteer producers and presenters now broadcasts.

May 2025 the station opened its brand-new Studio 2 in a room next to the existing studio. The upgraded space is equipped with modern DJ and broadcasting equipment, designed to engage both young talent and seasoned voices in the community.

== Outside broadcasts ==
- Frome Question Time – A series of Question Time style events relating to local issues in the down such as the Saxonvale development, 20 mph speed limits and free schools.
- Frome Half Marathon – Frome's first 10K and Half marathon road races attracted around 700 entrants. FromeFM's coverage included an interview with one of the event sponsors, a chat with one of the designated charities who benefited from the money raised and on the spot reportage from the start/finish.
- 2012 Olympic torch Relay – The first outside broadcast on 96.6 MHz FM came during test transmissions when the 2012 Olympic flame was carried through the town. There were contributions from the outgoing mayor of Frome, Nick White, a commentary from David Heath MP and interviews with some of the children who turned out to wave flags.
- 2016 Frome Carnival. Live coverage of the Children's Carnival procession as it wound its way along Christchurch Street West.
- 2017 - live relay of first Frome Town Council Town Matters meeting from the new Town Hall.
- General Election hustings, May 2017. Live coverage of all-party hustings from Frome Town Football Club via microwave links to the studios at the Town Hall.
- General Election hustings, July 2024. Live coverage of all-party hustings from Frome Cheese and Grain.

== Frome Festival ==
FromeFM provides extensive coverage of the Frome Festival events each July with daily breakfast shows and outside broadcasts promoting the day's events with features, reviews and interviews about Festival activities and participants.
