= Kerry Wilkinson =

British author and journalist (born 1980)

- Born: 4 November 1980 (age 45); Bath, Somerset, England
- Education: Frome Community College, Somerset, University of Central Lancashire
- Occupations: Novelist, Journalist
- Writing career
- Period: 2011 –
- Genres: Crime fiction, young adult fiction
- Notable works: The Jessica Daniel novels, The Whitecliff novels
- Notable awards: RoNA Award, International Thriller Writers Awards
- Website: www.kerrywilkinson.com

Kerry Wilkinson (born 4 November 1980) is a British author and sports journalist born in Bath, Somerset.

In 2018, his book Ten Birthdays won the Romantic Novelists' Association award for Young Adult Novel of the Year. Along with Marius Gabriel, he was the first man to win a RoNA Award in the organisation's 58-year history. He is also an International Thriller Writers Awards winner, with Close To You, for best ebook original.

In March 2023, he wrote an article for The Bookseller, entitled Autism can be a huge publishing strength—and challenge about how he was an adult when he discovered he was autistic.

== Work ==
Kerry Wilkinson is an author who has had bestselling ebooks in the UK, Canada, Australia and South Africa. In 2011, he became one of the United Kingdom's most-successful self-published authors, but has since worked with 'traditional' publishers. In the final quarter of 2011, Amazon UK announced he was their top-selling author for their Amazon Kindle chart - and that he had sold over 250,000 ebooks.

His first novel, Locked In, went to number one on the Amazon Kindle chart and Apple's iTunes crime books chart. At one point in November 2011, he had the top three books in the crime chart.

He signed a six-book deal with Pan Books in February 2012 to publish his Jessica Daniel series of novels. Shortly after, it was announced he was one of Amazon's top-10 bestselling UK-born authors worldwide for 2011, and then one of Amazon's top-10 bestselling Kindle authors overall for the following year.

In September 2012, Pan Macmillan announced they had acquired a "fantasy trilogy for young adults", the Silver Blackthorn series, Meanwhile, when the same publisher released the fourth Jessica Daniel book, Think of the Children, it became Amazon UK's no.1 ebook pre-order in February 2013, with the paperback peaking at number 19 on the UK chart.

In August 2013, The Bookseller reported that Pan Macmillan had bought two more books from Wilkinson, including a standalone crime novel, Down Among The Dead Men; and Something Wicked, a spin-off from the Jessica Daniel series.

A further deal followed in 2014 for another book in the Jessica Daniel series, another Andrew Hunter book, and a standalone crime thriller entitled, No Place Like Home. In 2015, the Bookseller reported his sales were "fast approaching the one million mark".

With the Jessica Daniel series continuing through Pan Books in the UK, publisher Bookouture secured the rights to publish the series in the United States, as well as global rights for "two psychological thrillers".

In 2017, the first of those thrillers, Two Sisters, peaked at No.1 in Canada's Kindle chart and the iBooks chart. It also reached No.14 in the UK Kindle chart and No.20 in the United States.

The second, The Girl Who Came Back, reached No.1 in the UK Kobo chart and No.2 in the UK Kindle chart. It also became his second No.1 in Canada.

In 2021, publisher Bookouture announced Wilkinson's novel, The Blame, was his "30th book with us: the most titles Bookouture has ever released from one author". It also acquired "World All Languages rights for two more addictive psychological thrillers, plus the coming-of-age novel Truly, Madly, Amy"

A year later, the publisher said they had "signed a four-book mystery series with bestselling author Kerry Wilkinson". The Whitecliff series was then released in 2023. The company also signed "a pair of linked books, about a girl who goes to a teenage sleepover: but when she wakes up, her friends have vanished." The Night Of The Sleepover and After The Sleepover were released in October and December 2023.

In August 2024, Wilkinson signed a deal with Bookouture for his 50th novel to be published. The company's publishing director, Ellen Gleeson, said: "Writing 50 books is an incredible accomplishment. Kerry has an unrivalled understanding of what makes a small town tick."

== Awards ==
Date	Awards	Category	Book	Other nominees	Result	Ref.
March 2018	Romantic Novelists' Association Awards	Best Young Adult Romantic Novel	Ten Birthdays	Juno Dawson - Margot And Me; Keris Stainton - One Italian Summer	Won	
July 2020	International Thriller Writers Awards	Best Ebook Original	Close To You	Brett Battles - Night Man; Sean Black - The Deep Abridging; Brian Shea - Murder Board; LynDee Walker - Leave No Stone	Won	
May 2025	Crime Writers of Canada Awards of Excellence	Best Crime Novel Set in Canada	The Call	Brenda Chapman - Fatal Harvest (A Hunter and Tate Mystery); Barry W. Levy - The War Machine; Shane Peacock - As We Forgive Others; Greg Rhyno - Who By Fire (A Dame Polara Mystery)	Nominated	

== Education ==
Wilkinson attended Oakfield Middle School and Frome Community College in Frome, Somerset. He has a degree in journalism from the University of Central Lancashire.

== Support ==
Wilkinson sponsors the annual short story competition for young writers in his home town of Frome. This is part of the Frome Festival.

== Bibliography ==
=== Miscellaneous ===
- Official Handbook of the Marvel Universe: Spider-Man (2005) (co-writer)

=== Jessica Daniel crime novels ===
The Jessica Daniel novels are also available as audiobooks, read by Becky Hindley.

#	Title	Out	ISBN
1	Locked In (UK)	2011	978-1447225645
1	The Killer Inside (US)	2016	
2	Vigilante	2011	978-1447225669
2½	As If By Magic	2012	
3	The Woman In Black	2011	978-1447225676
4	Think Of The Children	Feb 2013	978-1447223405
5	Playing With Fire	Jul 2013	978-1447223412
6	Thicker Than Water (UK)	Oct 2013	978-1447223429
6	The Missing Dead (US)	Mar 2017	
7	Behind Closed Doors	Jan 2013	978-1447247852
8	Crossing The Line	Sep 2014	978-1447247876
9	Scarred For Life	Jan 2015	978-1447247890
10	For Richer, For Poorer	Feb 2016	978-1447280927
11	Nothing But Trouble	Feb 2017	978-1447285441
12	Eye For An Eye	Jan 2018	978-1509806652
13	Silent Suspect	Jan 2019	978-0957016422
14	The Unlucky Ones	Jul 2019	978-0957016446
15	A Cry In The Night	Jan 2020	978-0957016453

=== Whitecliff mystery novels ===
The Whitecliff mystery novels are also available as audiobooks, read by Helen Keeley.

#	Title	Out	ISBN
1	The One Who Fell	Apr 2023	978-1837900527
2	The One Who Was Taken	Apr 2023	978-1837900985
3	The Ones Who Are Buried	Apr 2023	978-1837901388
4	The Ones Who Are Hidden	May 2023	978-1837903559

=== Andrew Hunter crime novels ===
The Andrew Hunter novels are also available as audiobooks, read by Nigel Patterson.

#	Title	Out	ISBN
1	Something Wicked	Jun 2014	978-1447262091
2	Something Hidden	Jun 2015	978-1509806638
3	Something Buried	Feb 2019	978-0957016439

=== Silver Blackthorn novels ===
#	Title	Publisher	Out	ISBN
1	Reckoning	Pan Books, UK	May 2014	978-1447235309
1	Reckoning	St. Martin's Press, US	Jul 2014	978-1250053534
2	Renegade	Pan Books, UK	May 2015	978-1447235316
2	Renegade	St. Martin's Press, US	Jul 2015	978-1250061331
3	Resurgence	Pan Books, UK	May 2016	978-1250061331
3	Resurgence	St. Martin's Press, US	Jul 2016	978-1250090799

=== Other crime novels ===
#	Title	Out	Audio narrator	ISBN
1	Watched: When Road Rage Follows You Home	Nov 2013	N/A	N/A
2	Down Among The Dead Men	Sep 2015	Joe Jameson	978-1447253303
3	No Place Like Home	Nov 2016	N/A	978-1509804443
4	Two Sisters	Jun 2017	Alison Campbell	978-1786812094
5	The Girl Who Came Back	Sep 2017	Alison Campbell	978-1786812667
6	Last Night	Mar 2018	Alison Campbell	978-1786814241
7	The Wife's Secret	Oct 2018	Alison Campbell, Alan Medcroft	978-1786817075
8	A Face In The Crowd	Jun 2019	Alison Campbell	978-1786817648
9	Close To You	Oct 2019	Alison Campbell	978-1838881627
10	After The Accident	Mar 2020	Kerry Wilkinson, Alison Campbell, Alan Medcroft, Martin Reeve, Andrew Kingston, Diana Croft, Tamsin Kennard	978-1838885168
11	The Child Across The Street	Jul 2020	Alison Campbell	978-1838887490
12	What My Husband Did	Nov 2020	Alison Campbell	978-1838888602
13	The Blame	Feb 2021	Andrew Kingston	978-1800195028
14	The Child In The Photo	Jun 2021	Alison Campbell	978-1800195042
15	The Perfect Daughter	Sep 2021	Alison Campbell	978-1800197299
16	The Party At Number 12	Mar 2022	Tamsin Kennard, Andrew Kingston	978-1803142777
17	The Boyfriend	Jun 2022	Emma Newman	978-1803142753
18	The Night Of The Sleepover	Oct 2023	Olivia Darnley	978-1835250235
19	After The Sleepover	Dec 2023	Olivia Darnley	978-1835250266
20	The Call	Apr 2024	Willow Nash	978-1835254691
21	The Missing Body	Jul 2024	Rebecca Lee	978-1835254301
22	Home Is Where The Lies Live	Dec 2024	Julia Barrie, Rebecca Lee, Matthew Spencer	978-1836183266
23	My Son's Girlfriend	Feb 2025	Melanie Crawley	978-1836185178
24	Your Husband's Fault	May 2025	Melanie Crawley	978-1836187226
25	The Tapes	Aug 2025	Melanie Crawley, Shaheen Khan	978-1805500636
26	Tag, You're It	Jan 2026	Daphne Kouma	978-1805505426
27	Two Missing Girls	Jun 2026	Daphne Kouma, Julie Teal	978-1805505457
28	Will I Be Next?	Oct 2026	Rose Robinson	978-1807222543

=== Other novels ===
#	Title	Out	Audio narrator	ISBN
1	Ten Birthdays	Apr 2017	Alex Tregear	978-1786811837
2	The Death And Life Of Eleanor Parker	Jul 2018	Alison Campbell	978-1786812544
3	Truly, Madly, Amy	Jul 2022	Joe Jameson	978-1803142739

=== Translations ===
Original title	Title	Country	Publisher	Out	ISBN
Locked In	Κλειδωμένοι	Greece	Bell	2012	978-9605070465
Locked In	Encerrada	Spain	B	2012	978-8466651905
Locked In	Kilitli	Turkey	Optimum Kitap	2012	978-6056291210
Locked In	Slučaj Houdini	Croatia	Ark Books	2013	978-9531414173
Locked In	Eingesperrt	Germany	AmazonCrossing	2013	978-1477849668
Locked In	W potrzasku	Poland	Dragon	2019	978-8378878896
Locked In	Op slot	Netherlands	Wonderland	2025	
Vigilante	Czarna lista	Poland	Dragon	2019	978-8381720946
Vigilante	Infazci	Turkey	Optimum Kitap	2013	978-6054688043
Vigilante	Wreker	Netherlands	Wonderland	2025	
The Woman In Black	Kobieta w czerni	Poland	Dragon	2020	978-8381724418
The Woman In Black	Siyahlı Kadın	Turkey	Optimum Kitap	2014	978-6054688135
The Woman In Black	De vrouw in het zwart	Netherlands	Wonderland	2025	
Think Of The Children	Gra pozorów	Poland	Dragon	2021	978-8381727235
Think Of The Children	Denk aan de kinderen	Netherlands	Wonderland	2025	
Playing With Fire	Zabawa z ogniem	Poland	Dragon	2022	978-8381729154
The Girl Who Came Back	Το κορίτσι που γύρισε πίσω	Greece	Mati	2017	978-6185021849
The Girl Who Came Back	A lány, aki visszatért	Hungary	Álomgyár	2018	978-6155875489
The Girl Who Came Back	13 anni dopo	Italy	Newton Compton Editori	2018	978-8822718150
The Girl Who Came Back	Das Mädchen, das zurückkam	Germany	Bookouture	2025	978-1836186441
The Wife's Secret	Il matrimonio degli inganni	Italy	Newton Compton Editori	2019	978-8822727824
The Child In The Photo	Fotoğraftaki Çocuk	Turkey	Nemesis Kitap	2022	978-6258400823
The Night Of The Sleepover	Přespávačka	Czech Republic	George Publishing	2024	978-8053022064
The Tapes	De tapes	Netherlands	Uitgeverij De Fontein	2026	978-9026184932
The Tapes	Lindid	Estonia	Kirjastus Ersen	2026	978-9908622651
