= Blue House (disambiguation) =

Cheong Wa Dae, also known as the Blue House, is the executive office and official residence of the President of South Korea.

Blue House may also refer to:

- Blue House (album), a 1994 blues album by Marcia Ball
- Blue House (Hong Kong), a tenement block
- Blue House, Frome, a Grade I listed building in Somerset, England
- Frida Kahlo Museum in Mexico, also known as "The Blue House" or "La Casa Azul"

== See also ==
- Blue Palace
- House of Blues
- John Blue House (disambiguation)
- Blue House Raid, an attempted assassination of the President of South Korea in 1968
