= Frome =

Town in Somerset, England

Coordinates: 51.228°N 2.324°W

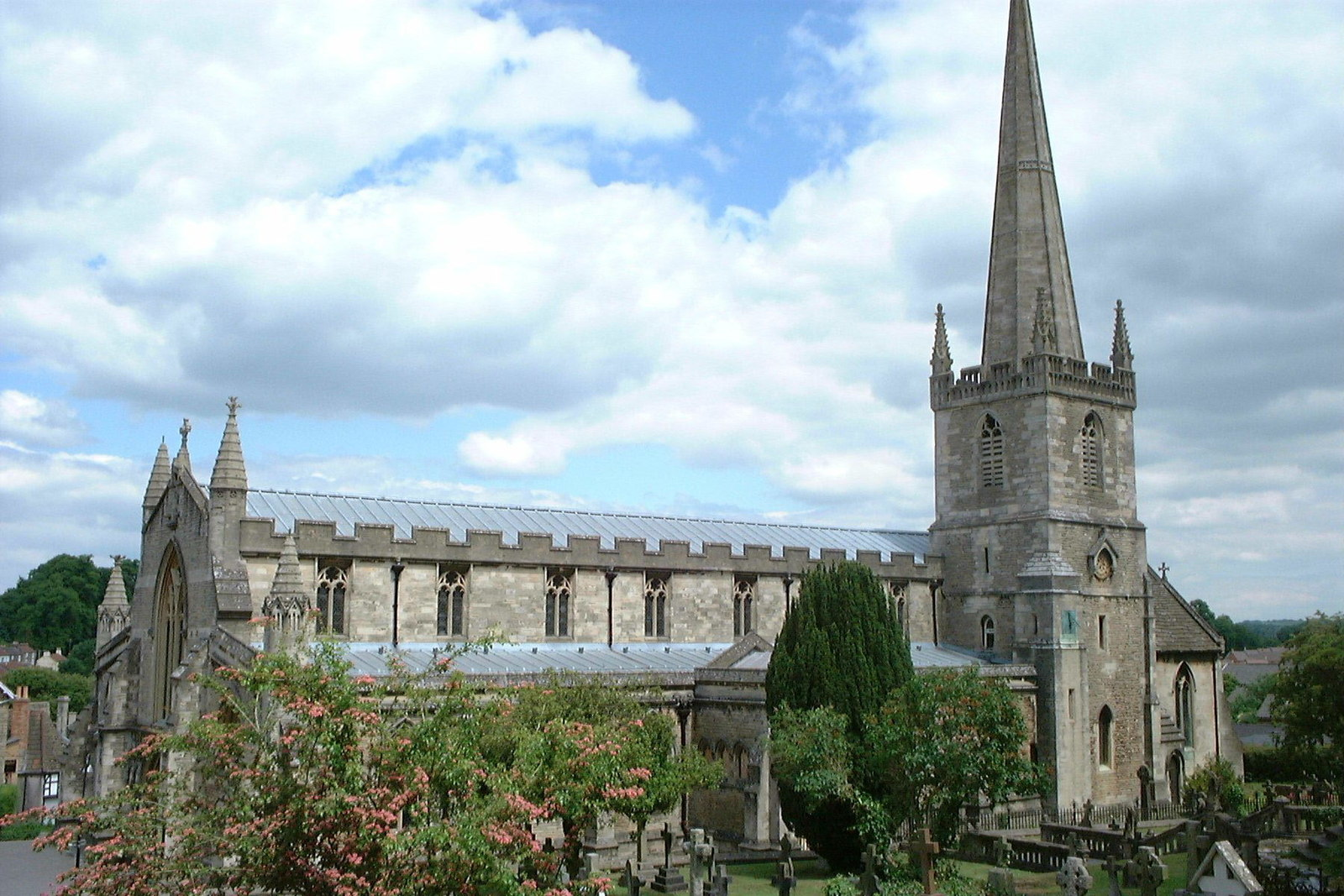
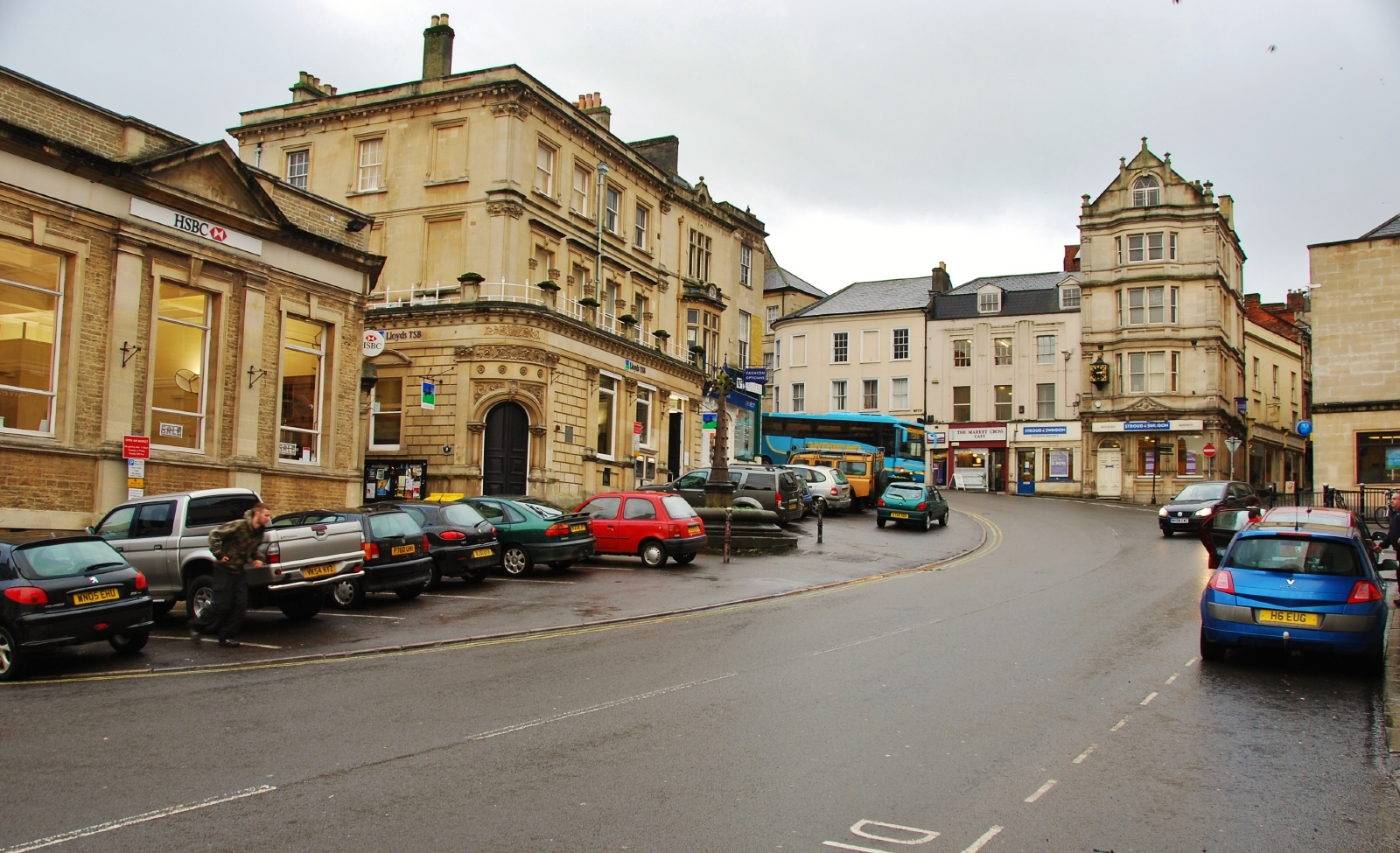
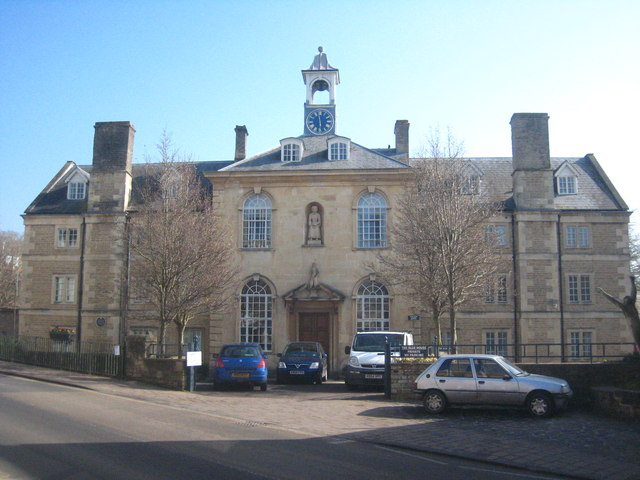
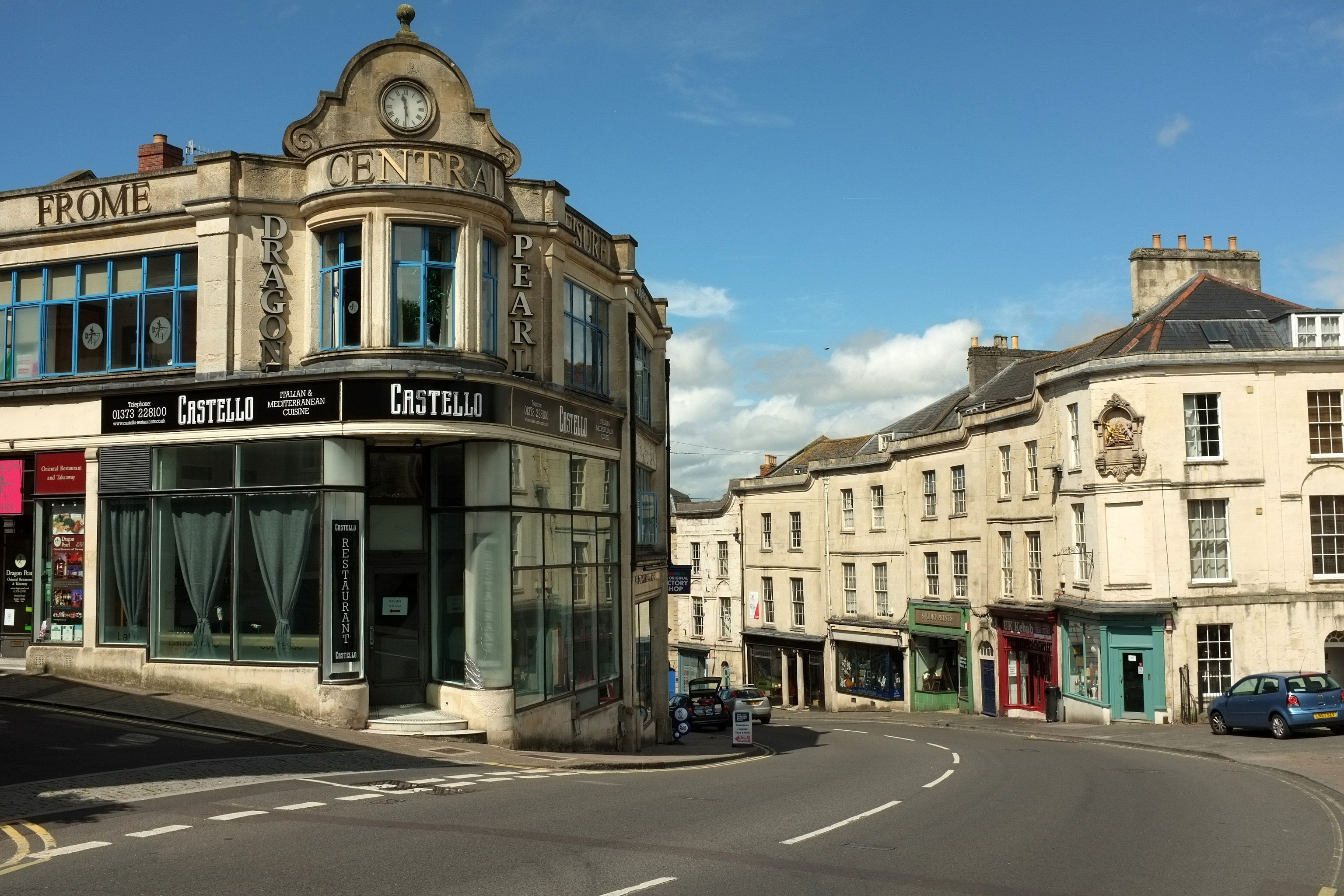
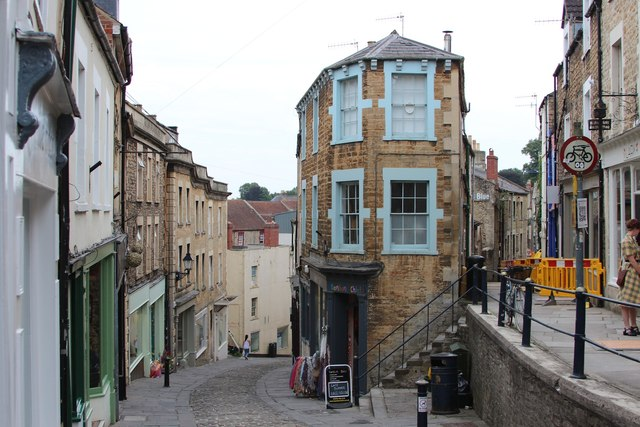
- From top to bottom-right: Church of St John the Baptist, Market Place, Blue House, Bath Street, Catherine Hill

- Location within Somerset
- Population: 28,567 (Parish, 2021); 27,905 (Built-up area, 2021)
- OS grid reference: ST775477
- Unitary authority: Somerset Council
- Ceremonial county: Somerset
- Region: South West
- Country: England
- Sovereign state: United Kingdom
- Post town: FROME
- Postcode district: BA11
- Dialling code: 01373
- Police: Avon and Somerset
- Fire: Devon and Somerset
- Ambulance: South Western
- UK Parliament: Frome and East Somerset
- Website: Town Council

Frome (/ˈfruːm/ FROOM) is a town and civil parish in Somerset, England, at the eastern end of the Mendip Hills on the River Frome, 13 miles (21 km) south of Bath. At the 2021 census, it had a population of 28,567.

Frome was one of the largest towns in Somerset until the Industrial Revolution. It first grew due to the wool and cloth industry, and later diversified into metal-working and printing. The town was enlarged during the 20th century but retains a large number of listed buildings, and most of the centre falls within a conservation area.

The town has road and rail transport links and acts as an economic, sporting and cultural centre for the surrounding area, including the annual Frome Festival and Frome Museum.

== History ==
=== Prehistoric ===
Finds from Whatley Quarry near Mells suggest the presence of late Pleistocene mankind.

Neolithic bowl barrows have been located in nearby Trudoxhill. At Murtry Hill, just 3 km to the north-west of Frome, a Neolithic long barrow 35m long by 19m wide was located with substantial upright stones (Orchardleigh Stones), a 'chest' burial and cremation urns. Within Frome itself, another long barrow was found, with skeletons, pottery and a standing stone; its structure seemed similar to the Long Kennet barrow. Others from the Bronze Age have been identified in Berkley to the north-east and near Nunney to the south-west.

The name Frome comes from the Proto-Brythonic word *frāmā (Modern Welsh ffraw), itself from Proto-Celtic *srōm- meaning fair, fine or brisk and describing the flow of the river. In 2019, the BBC ranked Frome as, among places in the UK, having the most difficult name to pronounce.

=== Roman history ===
There is limited evidence of Roman settlement in the area. The remains of a villa were found in the village of Whatley, 3 miles (5 km) to the west of Frome. Another villa is suggested at Selwood. Southill House in Cranmore, 10 miles southwest, has evidence of a villa with a hypocaust. Two villas have been surveyed in the Hemington area, 3 miles (5 km) to the north-west of Frome, alongside other sites, ditches and boundaries.

A Roman road ran from the west of the Mendips passing south of Frome en route to Old Sarum (Salisbury) and Clausentum (Southampton) or to Moriconium (Hamworthy near Poole), probably for the export of lead and silver from mines in the Mendips. Part of a Romano-British sculpted head and part of a Roman road surface were found near Clink, Frome: possibly linked to a Roman road running south from Aquae Sulis (Bath), but this has been traced only as far as Oldford Farm, Selwood, just 2 miles (3 km) north of Frome. Just to the southeast is Friggle Street, suggestive of a Roman road.

In April 2010, the Frome Hoard, one of the largest hoards of Roman coins discovered in Britain, was found in a field near the town by a metal detectorist; the 52,500 coins dating from the third century AD were in a jar 14 inches (36 cm) below the surface. The coins were excavated by archaeologists from the Portable Antiquities Scheme, and some are now on display in the British Museum. The find was the subject of a BBC TV programme Digging for Britain in August 2010. A further 250 Dubonnic coins had been found in an urn when ploughing near Nunney in 1860; they included those of Claudius who began the conquest of Britain. Other coins continue to be found in this neighbourhood, both Roman and Byzantine.

=== Medieval ===
A church built by St. Aldhelm in 685 is the earliest evidence of Saxon occupation of Frome. Aldhelm was a member of the Wessex royal family, cousin to King Cenwealh. The name was first recorded in 701 when Pope Sergius gave permission to Bishop Aldhelm to found a monastery "close to the river which is called From" (Latin: "juxta fluvium qui vocatur From"). The Saxon kings appear to have used Frome as a base from which to hunt in Selwood Forest. In 934 a witenagemot was held there, indicating that Frome must already have been a significant settlement, with even a royal palace. The charter names a Welsh sub-king, sixteen bishops and twenty five ministers, all called by Æthelstan, now regarded as the first king of England. Æthelstan's half-brother, King Eadred (son of Edward the Elder), died in Frome on 23 November 955.

At the time of the Domesday Survey, the manor was owned by King William, and was the principal settlement of the largest and wealthiest hundred in Somerset. Over the following years, parts of the original manor were spun off as distinct manors; for example, one was owned by the minster, later passing to the Abbey at Cirencester, which others were leased by the Crown to important families. By the 13th century, the Abbey had bought up some of the other manors (although it did let them out again) and was exploiting the profits from market and trade in the town. Local tradition asserts that Frome was a medieval borough, and the reeve of Frome is occasionally mentioned in documents after the reign of Edward I, but there is no direct evidence that Frome was a borough and no trace of any charter granted to it. However, the Kyre Park Charters of Edward's reign note a Hugh, lord of Parva (or little) Frome, as well as other witnesses. Additionally, Henry VII granted a charter to Edmund Leversedge, then lord of the manor, giving him the right to hold fairs on 22 July and 21 September. The parish was part of the hundred of Frome.

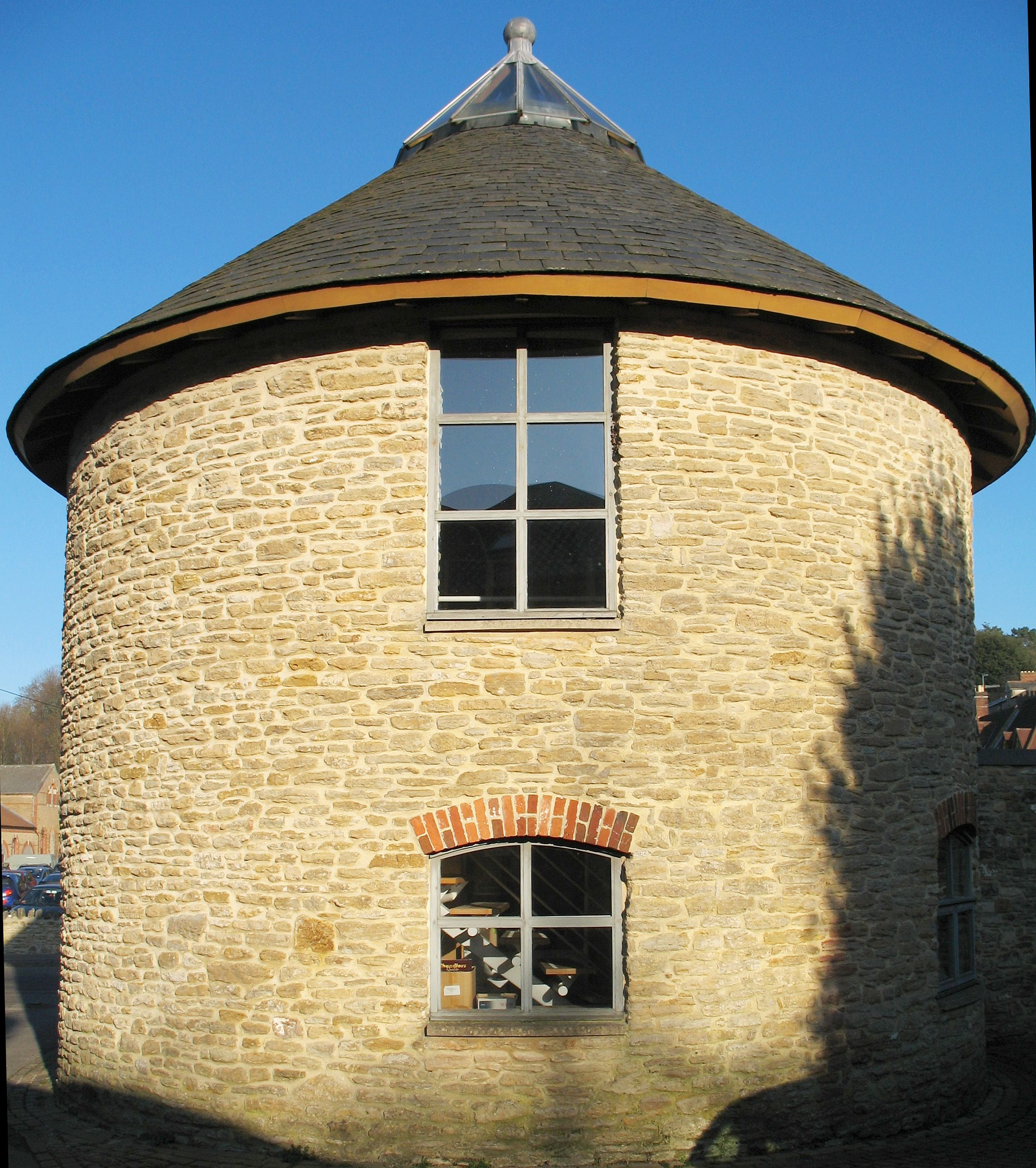
Former Wool Drying House, now part of The Black Swan Arts Centre

Hales Castle was probably built in the years immediately after the Norman Conquest of England in 1066. The circular ringwork is 120 feet (37 m) in diameter and stands on the northern slope of Roddenbury Hill, close to the Iron Age Roddenbury Hillfort, to the south-east of Frome. It comprises banks and outer ditches and has an unfinished bailey. At a similar distance to the south-west of Frome stands Nunney Castle, "aesthetically the most impressive castle in Somerset," built from 1373 onwards, surrounded by a moat.

In 1369, there was a record of 'three tuns of woad' being purchased by Thomas Bakere of Frome, probably from France. Such a large quantity of the blue dye suggests a well-established trade for local dyers and clothiers. A 1392 survey of the town mentions tentergrounds: fields of racks for drying the cloth and five fulling mills. Where originally wool was exported to Flanders and Italy, more was increasingly retained at home for the production of cloth. Woolens such as broadcloth and the lighter kersey became primary products for the area. Surnames such as Webbe (weaver) or Tayllor appear in the early 14th century and there are explicit references to cloth makers in 1475. By 1470 Somerset was the largest producer after Suffolk, making most of the undyed white broadcloths.

On 12 April 1477, a widow, Ankarette Twynho was taken from the manor house known locally as the Old Nunnery in Lower Keyford, accused by George Plantagenet, Duke of Clarence of the murder of Isabel Neville, Duchess of Clarence, who had died in 1476, probably of childbed-fever after birth of a short-lived son. At Warwick, she was charged with "having.....given the Duchess Isabel 'a venomous drink of ale mixed with poison' of which the Duchess has sickened from 10th October to Christmas, when she died. Ankarette protested her innocence, but a packed jury condemned her. She was sentenced and drawn to the gallows.....and hanged all within three hours." Clarence himself was imprisoned in the Tower shortly afterwards and was executed for treason early in 1478. Ankarette's grandson Roger Twynyho received from Edward IV a full posthumous pardon for Ankarette.

=== Monmouth Rebellion ===
On King Charles II's death in February 1685, the Duke of Monmouth, his illegitimate son, led the Monmouth Rebellion, landing with three ships at Lyme Regis in Dorset in early June 1685 in an attempt to take the throne from his Catholic uncle, James II. On 25 June 1685, Robert Smith, the constable of Frome declared Monmouth was King in Frome's marketplace, "as confidently as if he had the crown on his head". Frome was the first locality in England to declare for him. On 28 June, the forces of Monmouth camped in Frome, following their defeat in a skirmish with James II's forces at Norton St Philip, arriving at 4 o'clock in the morning "very wett and weary". Monmouth is reputed to have stayed in a gabled house in Cork Street, now named the Monmouth Chambers. Whatever discipline he had over his troops vanished as he dallied in Frome, unsure what to do. He left on 30 June for Shepton Mallett. At the subsequent 'Bloody Assizes' more than 500 rebels were brought in front of the court; out of these, 144 were hanged, drawn and quartered, their remains displayed across the country so that people understood the fate of those who rebelled against the king. The other rebels were subjected to transportation to America. In all, 50 Frome men were convicted. 12 men, none of them from Frome, were hanged in the town at Gibbet Hill, Gorehedge.

=== Rise and fall of the cloth trade ===
The manufacture of woollen cloth was established as the town's principal industry in the 15th century. In 1542 during one of his itineraries to observe historic English and Welsh landscapes, Leland described Frome as a town that "hathe a metley good market" and "dyvers fayre stone howsys in the towne that stand y the moste by clothinge". He went on to mention what seems to be Spring Gardens where the Mells River meets the River Frome: clothiers' buildings and fulling mills: "I cam to a botome, where an other broke ran in to Frome. And in this botome dwell certayne good clothiuars havynge fayre howsys and tukkynge myles." Frome remained the only Somerset town in which this staple industry flourished.

By the end of 1500s, the population was around 3,000. The trade declined but then revived again as various clothiers changed their products and expanded their business. The population doubled in size by the mid-1600s, though wages remained low for both weavers and spinners. From 1665 to 1725 further major expansion occurred, including the building of a new artisans' suburb, now known as the Trinity area, one of the earliest purpose built industrial housing in the country. The River provided power for a range of mills along its length, dyewood grinding, fulling, dyeing: 10 or more within 2 km of the town. In the mid-1720s, Daniel Defoe estimated that "Frome is now reckoned to have more people in it, than the city of Bath, and some say, than even Salisbury itself...... likely to be one of the greatest and wealthiest inland towns in England".

Poverty, the decline of the wool industry in the mid-18th century, increased industrialisation, and rising food prices led to some unrest amongst the inhabitants of Frome, and there were riots during the century. By 1791, the town was described in less flattering terms than those Defoe had used 50 years earlier. A survey of 1785 listed these occupations: "47 clothiers. 5 dyers, 12 fellmongers, 3 woolstaplers, 54 spinsters, 6 fullers, 146 shearmen, 141 scribblers, 220 weavers, 5 handle setters, 8 twisters, 4 spinning jenny men, for a total of 651 and for the ancillary card making industry 5 cardboard makers, 59 card makers and 23 wire drawers." These occupations of the cloth trade formed almost half of the heads of household in the town. The Sheppard family, settled in Frome since 1558, became dominant, building new factories, purchasing land and properties, being the first to bring in machinery; the establishment of turnpike roads improved access to markets home and abroad. Scribbling (rough carding), carding, spinning and fly shuttle weaving all became mechanised.

There were several public disturbances in this period. In 1754, a mob of Mendip colliers and destitute people from Frome protested against the rising cost of flour. A mill and its contents were burned down, others severely damaged. Rioters extorted money from mill owners. Four men were killed when an assault was made on another mill barricaded by the owner and three soldiers. In 1766, a miller in Beckington defended himself against a mob of 2,000, firing upon them, wounding some; all of his wheat and flour were seized and fires lit. In 1767, 500 local shearmen assembled and broke up a newly installed spinning jenny in a mill close to Frome. Among many actions across Somerset and Wiltshire, spinning jennies were smashed in a mill by a mob in 1781. In 1796, a body of Mendip colliers entered the town armed with bludgeons to force local millers to reduce their bread prices. The constable called for dragoons stationed in the town and they themselves were assaulted. Sabres were drawn and the mob dispersed, bloodied but without fatalities. Afterwards the constable was threatened with arson and murder. At a time of rising unemployment, the price of potatoes provoked a riot in Frome in 1816. Magistrates read the Riot Act and suppressed the trouble with local militia and dragoons, preventing an attack on a Sheppard factory.

By 1800, the population had increased beyond 12,000. There was a brief boost to the trade from the Napoleonic Wars, with Frome supplying blue uniform cloth of 160 miles a year in 1801. As mechanisation increased, fewer skills were required; wages fell along with living conditions. Dyeing ceased. Steam engines replaced water mills. By 1826, the parish established a blanket factory to employ the poor. A lack of investment locally meant the nation chose to buy the cheaper and lighter cloth produced elsewhere. Many mills closed as the trade steadily declined. Tucker's at Wallbridge, the last fabric mill of 'The Finest West of England Cloth', closed in 1965.

=== To the present day ===
In the early 19th century, plans were developed to reinvigorate the town and once again elevate it to its former position as a more important town than Bath. These plans, the idea of Thomas Bunn, a man of independent means inherited from his father, mostly failed to come to fruition, although some public buildings were erected and a wide new approach road to the town centre from the south was cut (named Bath Street after the landowner, Lord Bath of Longleat House).

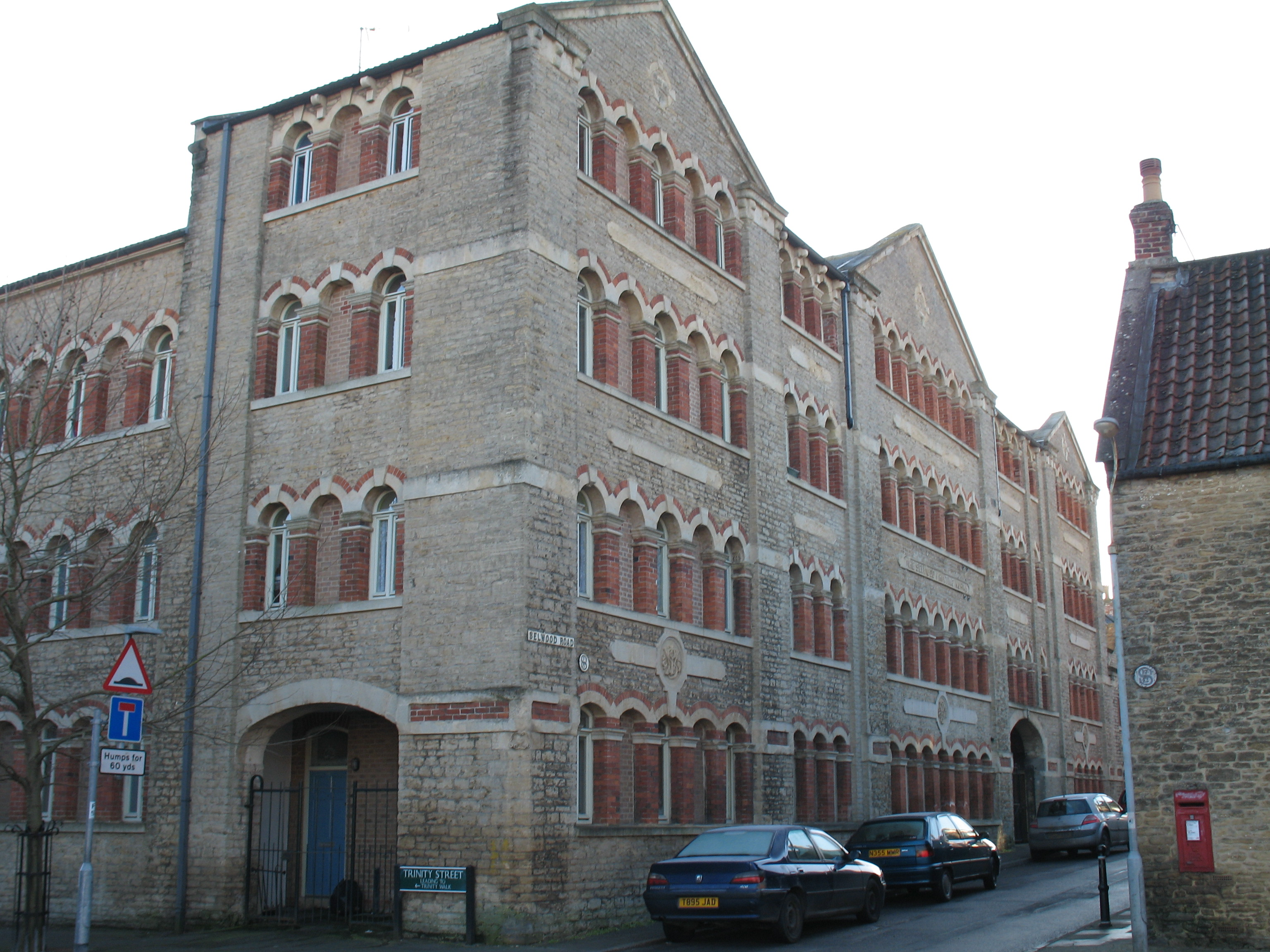
The former (Butler & Tanner) Selwood Printing Works

Whilst wool remained an important part of the town's economy into the 19th (and even 20th) centuries, other industries were established in the town. A bell-foundry started in 1684 by William Cockey grew to be a major producer of components for the developing gas industry and employer of 800 people, as a new enterprise of his descendant, Edward Cockey The J W Singer brass foundry and bronze-casting works, was a major employer and produced bronze statues. John Webb Singer was born in Frome and established his art metal work foundry in 1851. They made brass ornaments for local churches and became known through the Oxford Movement within the Church of England which led to increasing demand for church ornaments. In addition to church ornaments the firm developed new facilities, opened as the Frome Art Metalworks in 1866, and then the expertise to create large statues. One of the first statues cast in 1889 was that of General Gordon riding a camel. The firm was responsible for the bronze statue of Boudica with her daughters in her war chariot (furnished with scythes after the Persian fashion), which was commissioned by Prince Albert and executed by Thomas Thornycroft. It was unveiled in 1902, 17 years after Thornycroft's death, and now stands next to Westminster Bridge and the Houses of Parliament, London. The statue of Lady Justice on the dome above the Old Bailey was executed by the British sculptor, F. W. Pomeroy and cast by Singers. The statue of Alfred the Great at Winchester was a further commission. The statues from Singers have been exported around the world. Printing was another major industry, with the Butler and Tanner printworks being set up in the middle of the century. Brewing was another source of employment.

Utility services came quite early in Frome with Cockey setting up a gas facility in Welshpool in 1831. Water was available from springs; the principal source was from a fountain at the foot of Church Steps, fed by stream that flowed under the graveyard. After a local company failed to deliver piped water in 1880, the local government stepped in and opened a Water Works with a piped supply system. A sewage farm was not installed until 1885. Mains electricity was then introduced into the town in 1903.

In World War I, a large number of men from Frome and the surrounding villages enlisted. The Somerset Infantry was the primary recruiter; other county regiments took in many others. Over 450 lives, ranging from a brigadier-general to scores of privates and able seamen, were lost in the conflict, now recorded on memorials throughout the area and elsewhere. A record of more than 140 local survivors of WWI has been published. These survivors included Charlie Robbins who was the model for the bronze statue forged by the Singer company which stands as the memorial for the fallen of Frome.

The population fell and in the 1930s it was slightly smaller than it had been in the mid 19th century. Other industries such as printing, light engineering, metal casting, carpeting and dairying continued, many taking old premises from the cloth mills and others being sited at the new Marston Road Trading Estate which led to growth after World War II, including the construction of council houses. The town now has several new build housing estates (as of 2025) constructed around the suburbs, mostly around the Adderwell area.

== Governance ==
There are two tiers of local government covering Frome, at parish (town) and unitary authority level: Frome Town Council and Somerset Council. The town council is based at Frome Town Hall on Christchurch Street West.

For national elections, the town forms part of the Frome and East Somerset constituency.

=== Initiatives ===
In early 2015, the UK's first high street library of things was set up in the town. In one year (May 2018 to April 2019), use of the shop helped avoid 92 tonnes CO2e of greenhouse gas emissions, saved 117,000 kg of material usage and avoided 10 tonnes of manufacturing waste. In the same period its members collectively saved £66,800 by borrowing instead of buying items.

The Town Council installed the first community fridge in the country in May 2016; 90,000 items a year have been saved from landfill. This was joined by a community larder in October 2017.

On 13 December 2017 the Town Council unanimously agreed to become a 'single-use plastic'-free council.

Frome has an online market, the Food Hub launched in November 2018, where sustainable supplies from local farmers and food producers can be sourced, either for collection or by delivery (central Frome only).

There are both formal and informal public green spaces within the town; some such as the Victoria Park or the Rodden Meadow are substantial; others are smaller but are valued within their neighbourhoods, such as Weylands or the Dippy. Many of the public spaces have organised litter picks, arranged by local community groups.

=== Administrative history ===
Frome was an ancient parish in the Frome hundred of Somerset. As well as the town itself, the parish historically included surrounding rural areas. The parish was sometimes known as "Frome Selwood".

In 1832 the town became the Frome parliamentary borough (constituency). The first election was disputed by two well-known local men, who were personal enemies: Sir Thomas Champneys and Thomas Sheppard, a Tory and a Radical or Whig respectively. There were only 322 registered voters. On the first day, 10 December, Champneys arrived with hundreds of armed men and boys, who attacked Sheppard's supporters. A Sheppard supporter, Thomas Ford, was badly injured and died later. Special constables were sworn in by the magistrates in the George Inn. The mob besieged the building and smashed the windows. Sheppard retreated to his home, Fromefield House, guarded by 300 men. Dragoons were brought from Trowbridge to neighbouring Beckington. Early on the second day, Sheppard had gained 163 votes. The opponents attacked the Crown Inn trying to get at Sheppard in the George Inn next door; a draper's house was destroyed. Several constables were stoned and injured. The Riot Act was read. Constables with carbines opened fire. At 3pm the Dragoons arrived and the battle was halted. Having won 100 votes to Sheppard's 163, Champneys resigned. Sheppard won the next three elections, remaining Frome's MP until 1847.

The Frome parliamentary borough subsequently also became a local government district in 1865, administered by an elected local board. Such districts were reconstituted as urban districts under the Local Government Act 1894, which also directed that civil parishes could no longer straddle district boundaries. The parish of Frome was therefore reduced to match the urban district, and the surrounding rural parts of the parish became a separate parish called Selwood.

In 1953, Frome Urban District Council was granted a coat of arms.

Coat of arms of Frome Town Council

Notes
Granted to the urban district council on 14 August 1953. Transferred to the successor town council in 1974.
Crest
Out of a Saxon Crown Or a demi Dragon wings elevated and addorsed Gules supporting a Crozier Gold.
Escutcheon
Sable on a Chevron between in chief two Sallow Trees and in base a Teazle slipped Or a Chevron Ermine.
Motto
Time Trieth Troth

Frome Urban District was abolished in 1974 under the Local Government Act 1972. The area then became part of the new Mendip District. A successor parish called Frome covering the former urban district was created as part of the 1974 reforms, with its parish council taking the name Frome Town Council.

Mendip district was abolished in 2023. Somerset County Council then took over district-level functions across its area, making it a unitary authority, and was renamed Somerset Council.

== Healthcare ==
The town has a National Health Service community hospital, opened in 2008, originally operated by Somerset Primary Care Trust, located on the site of the former Showground at Fromefield.

The Frome Model is a programme to combat loneliness amongst residents, pioneered by a local GP, Helen Kingston, in 2013. It proved successful and reduced emergency hospital admissions by 17% over three years when in the rest of the county they rose by 29%, even though demographics were similar. "There are no other interventions which have ever reduced population emergency admissions like this", said one doctor. The programme's success has been credited in part with attracting an influx of middle-class newcomers to the town. Frome is "at the vanguard" of a growing movement to better incorporate nonclinical solutions into medical care, according to one doctor. Since 2016 there has been an effort to roll out the scheme across the entire Mendip area.

== Geography ==
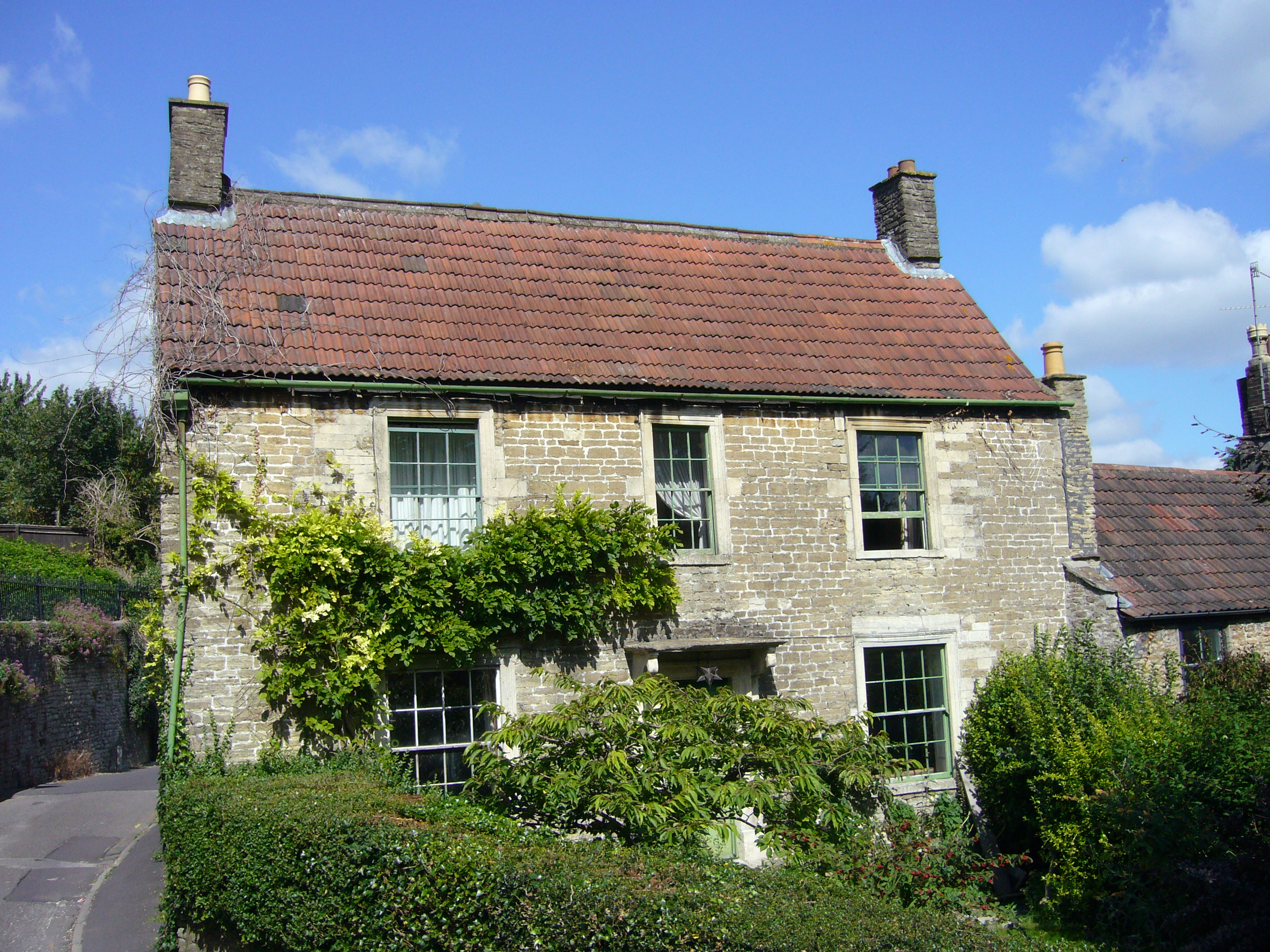
House on Bath Street

The town rests on Forest Marble which dates back to the Middle Jurassic, and has been used for local building. The area surrounding the town is Cornbrash, Oxford Clay and Greensand. Frome is unevenly built on high ground above the River Frome, which is crossed by a bridge in the town centre. The town centre is approximately 65 metres (213 ft) above sea-level, whilst the outer parts of the town are between 90 metres (295 ft) and 135 metres (443 ft) above sea-level. The main areas of the town are (approximately clockwise from the north-west): Innox Hill, Welshmill, Packsaddle, Fromefield, Stonebridge, Clink, Berkley Down, Easthill, Wallbridge, The Mount, Keyford and Lower Keyford, Marston Gate, The Butts, Critchill, Trinity, and Gould's Ground.

When Frome was founded in the 7th century AD, it lay in the centre of the Selwood Forest, Saxon Sealhwudu or 'Sallow Wood', also known as Coit Mawr, Great Wood, by the Welsh. It stretched from Gillingham in Dorset to Chippenham in Wiltshire, from Bruton to Warminster. It served as a boundary between Anglo-Saxon Wessex and the British kingdom of Dumnonia in the west. In 1086 it became a royal forest.

Frome has a temperate climate, generally wetter and milder than the rest of England. The annual mean temperature is about 10 °C (50 °F) with seasonal and diurnal variations, but due to the modifying effect of the sea, the range is less than in most other parts of the United Kingdom. January is the coldest month with mean minimum temperatures between 1 °C (34 °F) and 2 °C (36 °F). July and August are the warmest months in the region with mean daily maxima around 21 °C (70 °F). In general, December is the dullest month and June the sunniest. The south west of England enjoys a favoured location, particularly in summer, when the Azores High extends its influence north-eastwards towards the UK.

Cloud often forms inland, especially near hills, and reduces exposure to sunshine. The average annual sunshine totals around 1600 hours. Rainfall tends to be associated with Atlantic depressions or with convection. In summer, convection caused by solar surface heating sometimes forms shower clouds and a large proportion of the annual precipitation falls from showers and thunderstorms at this time of year. Average rainfall is around 800–900 mm (31–35 in). About 8–15 days of snowfall is typical. November to March have the highest mean wind speeds, with June to August having the lightest. The predominant wind direction is from the south west.

== Demography ==
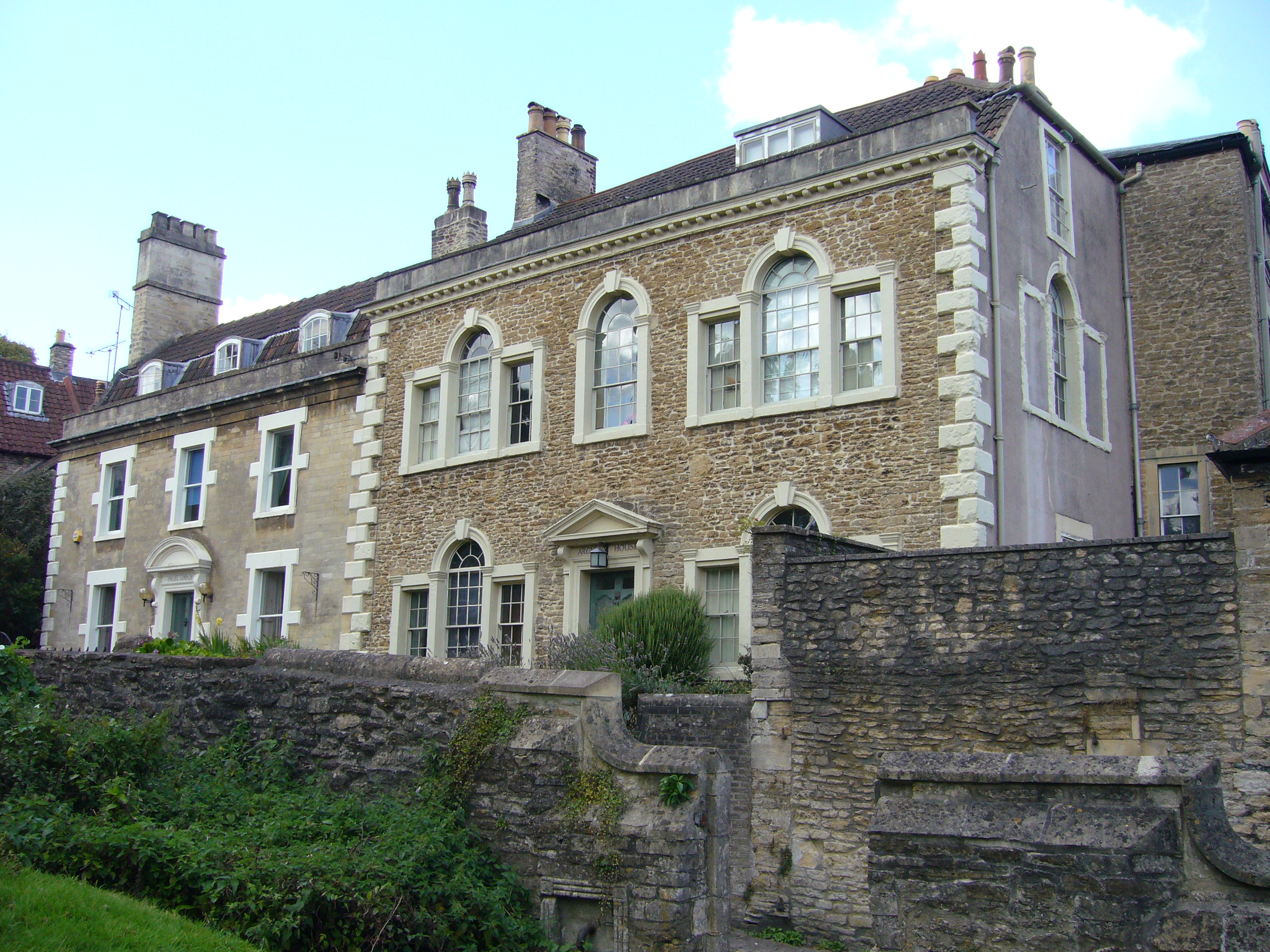
Argyll House, Gentle Street (Grade II* listed)

The population of Frome was 12,240 in the 1831 census, however it then declined to 11,057 in 1901 and remained between 11,000 and 12,000 until the 1970s. Since then, it has increased, nearly doubling to over 23,000 in 1991. In the 2011 census, the population was 26,203, comprising 11,863 (48.4%) males and 12,647 (51.6%) females. 7,674 (31.3%) residents were aged 16 or below, 13,150 (63.3%) between 16 and 65, and 3,686 (15.0%) aged 65 or over.

In the 2001 census of the population aged between 16 and 74, 11,580 (67%) were in employment, with only 513 (3%) unemployed (the remainder being otherwise economically inactive). About 68% of those in employment were in service industries, with the remainder in manufacturing. 4,323 people were employed in managerial or professional occupations, 1,362 were self-employed, and 4,635 in routine and semi-routine occupations. 10,198 households were recorded in the town, of which 7,679 (75%) were owner-occupied, 981 (10%) rented from private landlords, and 1,538 (15%) rented from the local authority or other social landlord. 10,122 (99.3%) heads of households were white.

== Economy ==
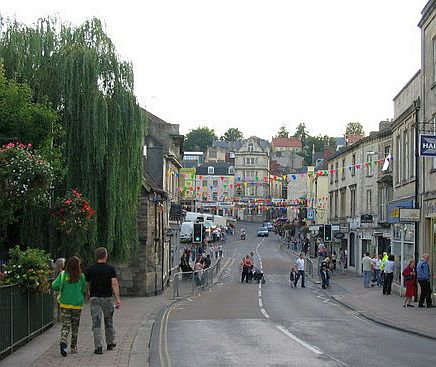
Market Place

The metal-working and printing industries which replaced wool as Frome's main industry have declined but not left the town. Singers still has a presence in the town, as does Butler and Tanner, although the latter (now named Butler Tanner and Dennis following a take-over) hit major financial difficulties in 2008, and made two-thirds of its workforce redundant.

Almost half of the economically active population of Frome commute to work outside the town (in Bath, Bristol, Warminster, Westbury or further afield). About 2,700 people commute into the town. A substantial part of the workforce has no formal qualifications and is poorly skilled, leaving them vulnerable to a decline in manufacturing work. There is no major local government employment in the town, and the principal public sector employers are the primary care trust and the schools.

Frome town centre contains a considerable number of independent shops, and a few chain stores. Retail is primarily aimed at serving the local population's requirements for food (there are two large supermarkets on opposite edges of the town, and three smaller supermarkets in the town centre), basic clothing, health and beauty, DIY and some electrical goods. However studies show that only about a quarter of the town's population do their non-food shopping in the town. Banks and building societies have branches in the town centre.

Markets are held on Wednesdays and Saturdays in the town centre: some in the Market Yard car park, and others in the former agricultural warehouse, the Cheese and Grain. From March to December, on the first Sunday of each month, a street market known as 'The Independent' is held. Attended by an average of 10,000 people, the main street is closed to traffic; it is filled with stalls that extend up Stony Street and St Catherine's Hill and to the main car park. Antiques, artisan wares, food and drink, designer & vintage clothing, plants fill the 150+ stalls. The Saturday cattle market was moved from the centre of the town to nearby Standerwick in the 1980s. In 2003, Frome was granted Fairtrade Town status.

A Vision for Frome 2008–2028 has been developed following a consultation with local people in the spring of 2008 which received over 3,000 responses. Mendip District Council and Mendip Strategic Partnership have consulted on a Community Strategy and Local Development Framework for the period to 2026 which includes building 2,500–2,600 new homes, providing more employment and office space, developing a new secondary school and two new primary schools, remodelling the town centre and encouraging a wider range of retailers and leisure providers into the town.

Significant housing developments have been made within Frome, many on former industrial sites, including a site at Saxonvale and Garsdale to include several hundred dwellings, shops and a 'cultural quarter' containing workshops for artists.

== Culture ==
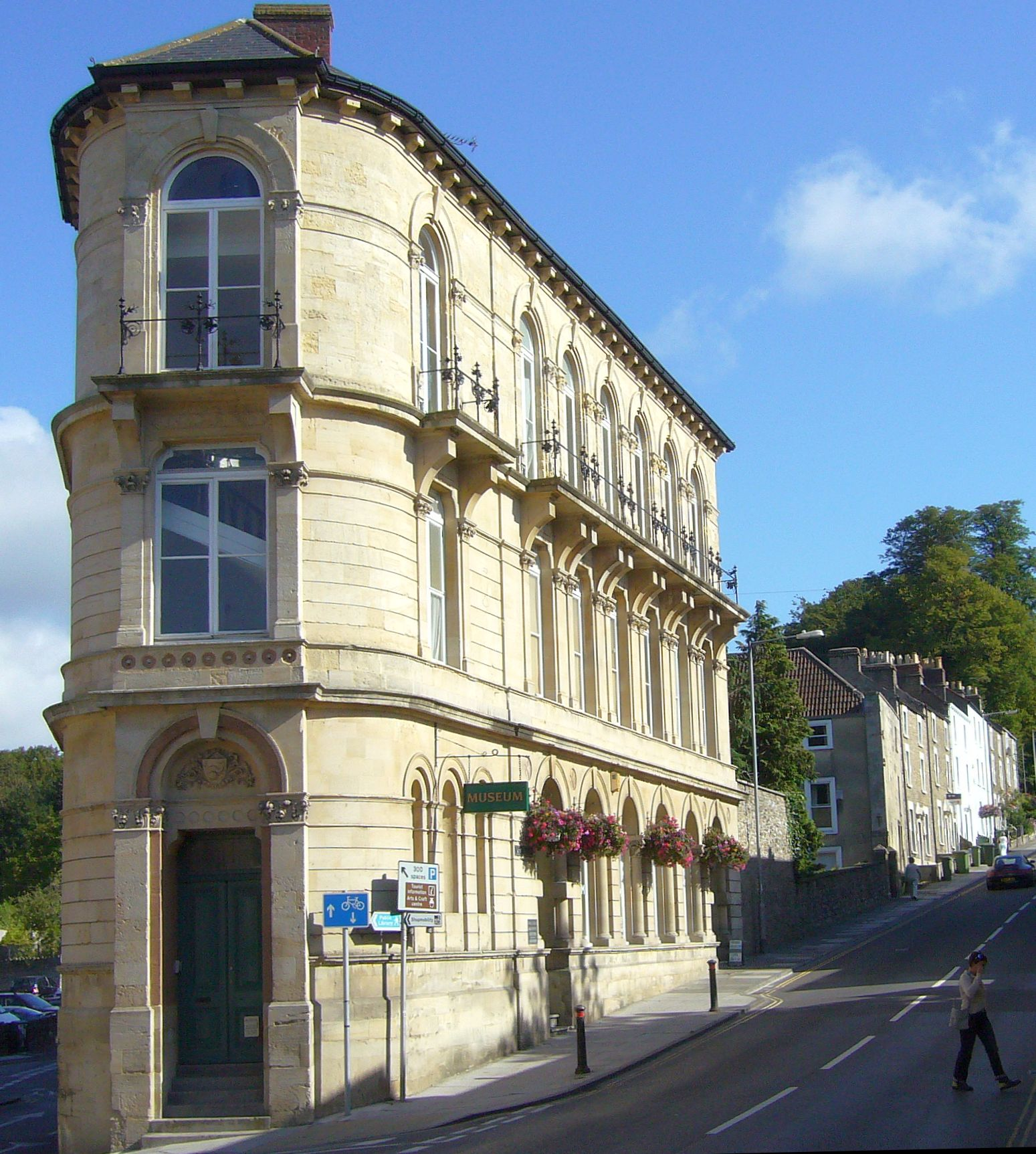
Frome Museum on North Parade

Frome has a vibrant arts scene. The high-point is the annual ten-day Frome Festival in July, which in recent years has included more than 160 events held at various venues in and around the town. The town is host to a number of artists, many of whom open their studios to the public during the Festival. The event includes a Children's Festival.

Annual cultural & community events include the Window Wonderland (early March), Frome Busks (late March), Apple Day (21 October), Fireworks (November) and Light the Night: lanterns and the Christmas Lights switch-on (late November). The Carnival (September) is part of the Wessex Grand Prix circuit of the West Country Carnival. A national Town Crier festival is held each year in June; for the third year running, it is the largest such festival in Britain, hosting 25 town criers.

There are two theatres in Frome: The Memorial Theatre was built in 1924 in memory of the fallen of the World War I, while the 240-seat Merlin Theatre is part of the Frome Community College campus. Frome is home to Somerset's first and only pub theatre: Nevertheless Productions, which promotes new drama in small venues around the town. The Cheese and Grain, a former farm produce warehouse converted into a market and concert hall in 1997, has a capacity of up to 800 and hosts regular pop concerts.

Frome's cinema, the Westway, is in Cork Street in the town centre, which closed in March 2016 and re-opened February 2017, after changing hands and refurbishment. A fire at the cinema in October 2016 was thought to have been started deliberately. There is an arts centre, The Black Swan, containing the information point for Discover Frome.

The Frome & District Agricultural Society holds an annual Agricultural & Cheese Show in September. This was formerly held on the Showground at Fromefield, but in recent years has moved to West Woodland, 2 miles (3.2 km) to the south of the town. Early markets were known as cheese fairs; the Agricultural Society was formed in 1861 and held its first fair. In 1875 the creation of the Market Hall (now the Cheese and Grain) and of a railway siding into the Cattle Market (now the main car park) established Frome as a cheese town – one sale alone recorded 28½ tons of Cheddar.

The Frome Society for Local Study was founded in 1958 to make the history of Frome and the district better known, and to preserve its historic buildings and records; there is an annual programme of winter lectures and summer visits to places of interest as well as a wide range of research, donations, and publications. It has funded plaques across the town, to mark significant buildings and prominent persons. The Frome Museum has a particular important collection of artefacts from Singer's bronze foundry and houses a rolling display of local history including a Cockey lamp and shop contents. The library and archive is open to researchers by appointment throughout the year.

Frome is served by two newspapers, the Frome & Somerset Standard and the Frome Times, the latter now has the third largest circulation in the county. In 2008, a 'not for profit' company called Frome Community Productions was formed by members of the community in order to develop and deliver FromeFM, an internet based community radio station. The station broadcasts 24 hours per day and is completely staffed by volunteers who produce features, interviews and music shows. In 2009, FromeFM commenced a service to stream the broadcasts to mobile phones. In late 2011 FromeFM was granted a broadcast licence and on 16 July 2012 began broadcast on 96.6FM in the Frome area. FromeTV, was another 'non-profit' organisation running an online TV station.

Frome is home to the Frome Writers Collective – a not for profit organization. Its patron is Barry Cunningham OBE.

Frome's Cheap Street is a location in episode six of the first series of BBC TV comedy The Fall and Rise of Reginald Perrin. Frome has provided the backdrop to historical dramas, such as Poldark, broadcast in 2016 which has regular scenes shot in Gentle Street, with a further shoot in December 2018 and Drover's Gold, filmed by BBC Wales in 1996. Wasted used exterior shots from Church Steps as the location for Stoned Henge. Catherine Hill, in the town centre, was the setting for the 2016 short film Lucky Chicken by Gulliver Moore which is available on YouTube.

== Landmarks ==
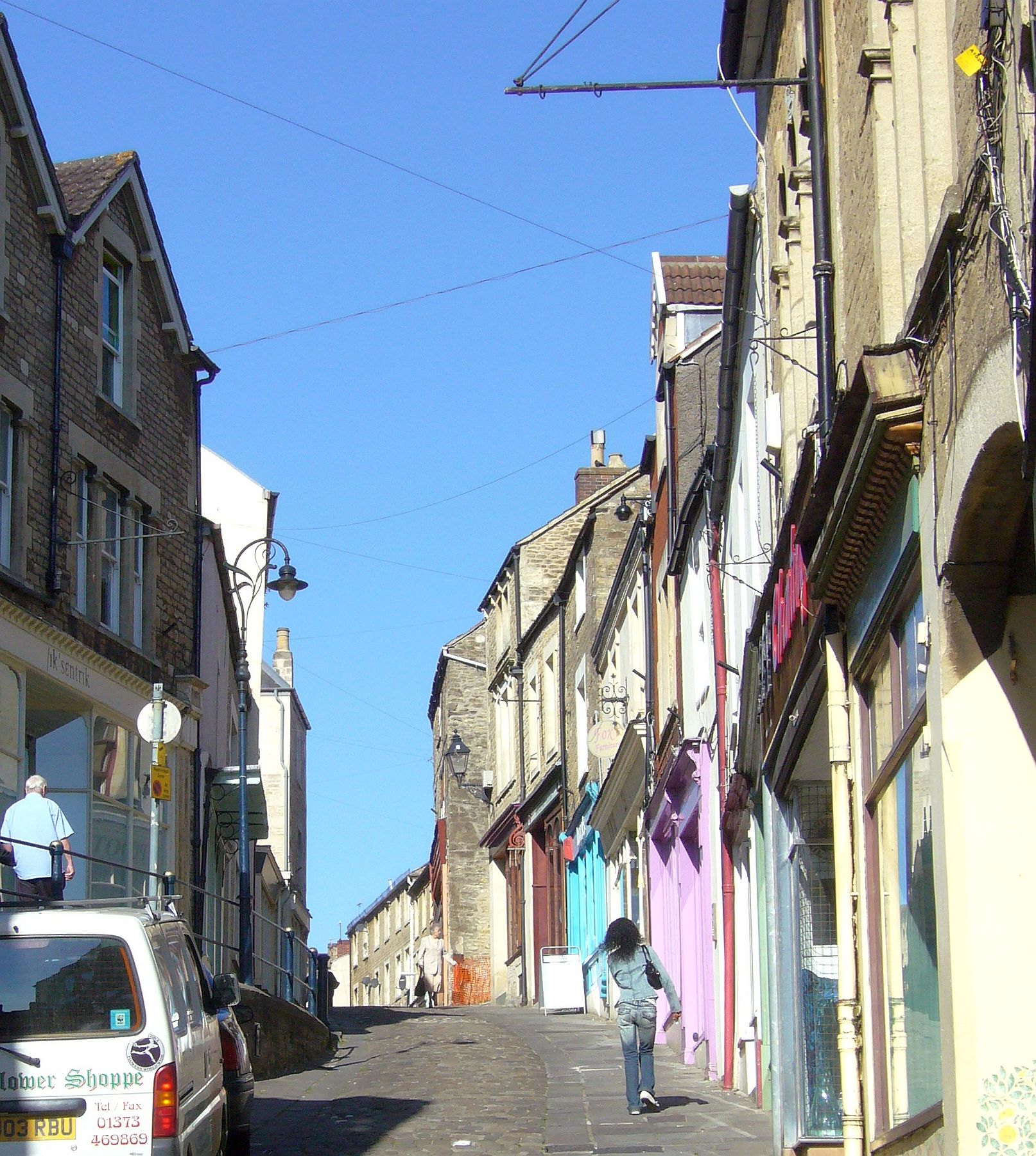
Catherine Hill

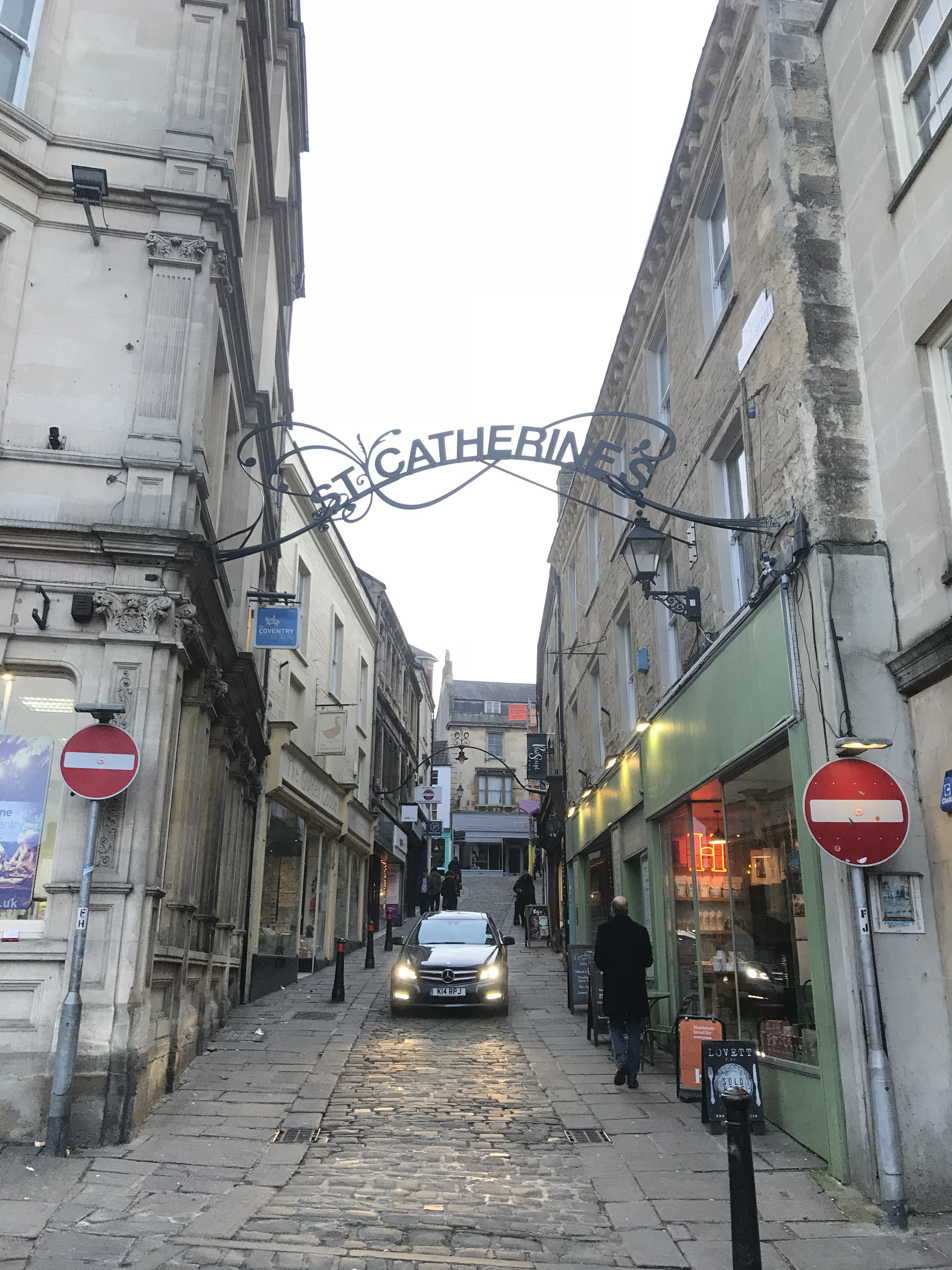
Stony Street, from Market Place to Catherine Hill

The older parts of Frome – for example, around Sheppard's Barton and Catherine Hill – are picturesque, containing an outstanding collection of small late 17th and 18th century houses. The Trinity area, which was built in the latter half of the 17th century and first half of the 18th, is a fine (and rare) example of early industrial housing. More than 300 houses were built between 1660 and 1756, in an unusual early example of a planned grid pattern. Although about half the area was demolished in the 1960s under a Slum Clearance Order, before its historical importance was realised; the remainder was saved and was restored at a cost of £4 million between 1980 and 1984. In this area is the elaborate former Selwood Printing Works. Stony Street, which leads into Catherine Hill, is a steep, cobbled road climbing out of the town centre. In the centre of the town, Cheap Street contains buildings dating to the 16th and 17th centuries and has a stream running down the middle fed by the spring at St John's Church. Cheap Street has never been used for vehicular traffic and its layout is based on land plots dating to approximately 1500. Despite a fire in 1923, the buildings have remained substantially unchanged since 1830, apart from shop-frontages.

The bridge in the centre of the town over the River Frome was rebuilt and widened in 1821, at which time a terrace of houses was built along one side of it. It is one of only three bridges in England that carry buildings; the others are Pulteney Bridge in Bath and the High Bridge in Lincoln. The Tourist Information Centre in Justice Lane is contained within a circular dye-house known to have been in existence by 1813, one of two surviving in the town (the other being in Willow Vale). It was restored in 1994. In the 1990s and early years of the 21st century, Frome benefited from considerable investment in the restoration of its historic buildings through the English Heritage Heritage Economic Regeneration Scheme and the National Lottery Townscape Heritage Initiative.

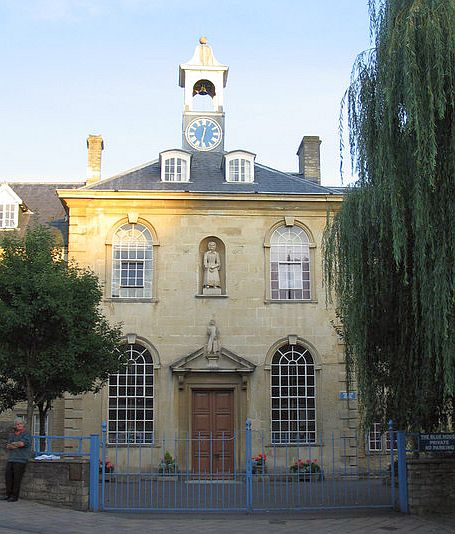
The Blue House, a Grade I listed building

Frome has 370 listed buildings, the greatest number within Somerset, outside of Bath. Individual buildings are best examined through Historic England's listings. Three of these (including the parish church) are Grade I listed. The Blue House, next to the town bridge, is another; it was formerly the Bluecoat School and Almshouses, named after the colour of the school uniforms. Built in 1726 at a cost of £1,401 8s 9d, it replaced an almshouse dating from 1461 and rebuilt in 1621. The Blue House provided a home for twenty widows and schooling for twenty boys. The front of the building is adorned by two statues, of a man and a woman, indicating the building's dual purpose. The building's role as a school came to an end in 1921 and it now provides accommodation for seventeen elderly residents.

Rook Lane Chapel was a nonconformist chapel built between 1705 and 1707 by James Pope: "The size and pride of the building are remarkable at so early a date." The chapel had a gallery around three sides and the centre of the ceiling was domed and supported by two Tuscan columns. Rook Lane ceased to be used as a chapel in 1968 and there followed twenty-five years of neglect. In the early 1990s the building was compulsorily purchased by Somerset County Council and transferred to the Somerset Buildings Preservation Trust, which carried out repairs and restorations. In 2001 it was converted by a firm of architects, the ground floor becoming a community hall and arts centre managed by Rook Lane Arts Trust and the galleried upper floor becoming offices for the architectural firm NVB Architects.

Frome is reputed to have one or more systems of tunnels beneath the streets of the older parts of the town. Some entrances are visible above ground; for example in the wall at the top of Stony Street, with other entrances in the cellars of shops and houses. Their purpose and full extent remain unknown but they have been investigated in recent years by at least one local group and a documentary has been made.

== Religious sites ==
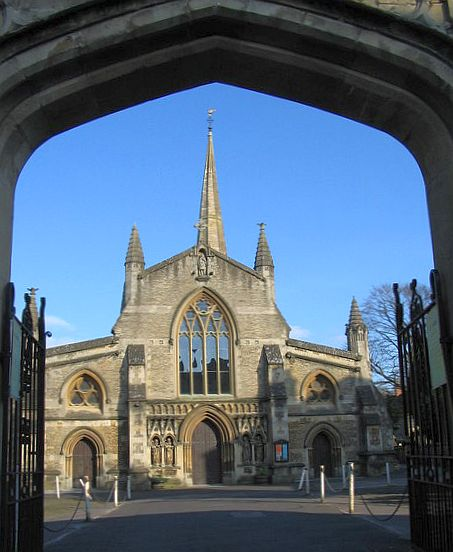
Church of St John the Baptist, Frome

The parish church of St John the Baptist, was built between the late 12th century and early 15th century replacing a 685 AD Saxon building. Major restoration work was carried out in the 1860s, including the construction of the Via Crucis, which is thought to be unique in an Anglican church. Outside the east end of the church is the tomb of Bishop Thomas Ken. The tower has eight bells, which bear inscriptions indicating that they were cast at various points between 1622 and 1792. A daughter church of St John's, Christ Church, was built in 1818 by George Allen Underwood, although considerable changes were made throughout the 19th and 20th centuries. Choral Evensong is sung at Christ Church on the first Sunday of each month except August at 6.00 pm. St Mary's Church at Innox Hill was built in 1862–1864 to the designs of C.E. Giles as a chapel of ease to St John's; it is small with a decorated sanctuary ceiling. The Anglican Church of the Holy Trinity was built in 1837–38 by Henry Goodridge in the style of Commissioners' Gothic.

In 1853, Irvingite Catholics (Catholic-Apostolic) began worshipping in a building in the West End until the church was closed. Nevertheless, there was a St Catherine's Catholic Church conducting weddings in Frome in 1904. The Roman Catholic church began in Frome after the building of a temporary church in Park Road in 1928, and a new church, St Catharine's Catholic Church, was finally built on the site in 1967 and 1968. Rook Lane Chapel, a noncomformist chapel, was in use from 1707 until 1968. In 1773, a split in the congregation of Rook Lane led to the establishment of another Zion Congregational Church in Whittox Lane. This building was replaced in 1810, and was extended in 1888 (a separate, octagonal school room with a conical roof having been built on the grounds in 1875).

Baptists worshipped in the town from 1669, in two churches. One was built in Sheppards Barton (now South Parade) in 1708. This was demolished and replaced by a new building in 1850, which was itself closed in 2001. Part of this building was converted to residential use but the main church, with a baptism pool, remains disused. A second Baptist church was built in Badcox Lane (now Catherine Street) in 1711. It was replaced with a new building in 1813, which was embellished with a Doric portico in 1845. It closed in 1962. The Methodist church, built in 1812 at Gorehedge, is still in use after additions in 1863, restoration in 1871 and internal rearrangement in the 1980s. Sun Street Chapel was erected by the Primitive Methodists in 1834, and closed in 1982, although it was used by another religious group afterwards; it is now used as a community centre. Another Methodist church was built on Portway in 1910 and ceased worship in 2022. A Dissenters' Cemetery with chapel at Vallis Road was founded in 1851 by Frome's 'Free Churches', mainly Baptist, Congregational and Methodist, and has been the site of over 6,000 burials.

== Transport ==
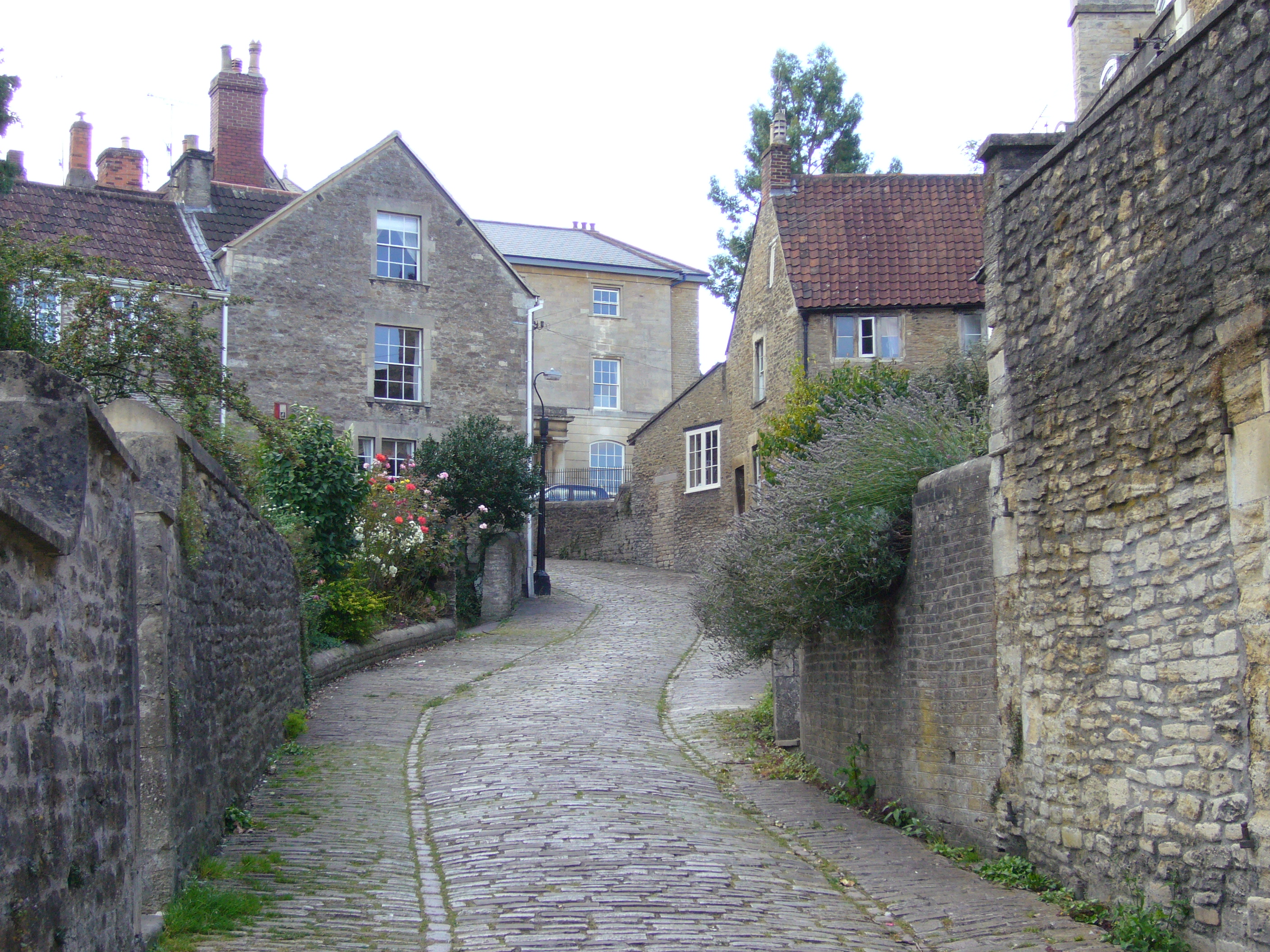
View up Gentle Street

Frome is served by the Heart of Wessex Line which passes the eastern edge of the town. Frome station was opened in 1850 and is one of the oldest railway stations still in operation in Britain, now with direct services to Bristol Temple Meads, Exeter St Davids, Weymouth and London Paddington. Trains are operated by Great Western Railway. A freight line, which branches off through the town to serve the quarries on the Mendip Hills, is mainly used by Mendip Rail; Freightliner took over the line in November 2019. A continuation of this line, which previously linked Frome to Radstock, is now the route of National Cycle Route 24, otherwise known as the Colliers Way.

Frome is served by a number of bus routes, the busiest being the D2/D2x First West of England service to Bath, followed by the X67 and X34 services run by Faresaver of Chippenham. Other companies running bus services in Frome include FromeBus and Libra Travel. The A361 bypasses the town around the southern and eastern edges, while the A362 passes through the centre of the town from north-west to south-east.

The Town Council employs a resilience officer, one of only two at town council or parish level in the country; a principal task is to support the strategic priorities for transport. Initiatives include a public-access car club, operated by the social enterprise Co-Wheels.

== Education ==
Frome has several first schools for pupils aged between 4 and 9 years. There are two middle schools for pupils between 9 and 13 years of age: Oakfield Academy and Selwood Anglican/Methodist Middle School. The town's main college, Frome Community College, provides education between ages 13 and 18, and has specialist "media arts" status. Frome College joined the Midsomer Norton Schools Partnership in 2024. Critchill School is a special school catering to students who have special educational needs and Farleigh Further Education College is for special needs students aged 16 to 25 with Asperger syndrome and associated conditions. There are no further or higher education establishments in Frome. Somerset Skills & Learning, which provides apprenticeships and training for young people and adults, has a site in the town.

== Media ==
Local news and television programmes are provided by BBC West and ITV West Country. Television signals are received from the Mendip TV transmitter. Local radio stations are BBC Radio Somerset on 95.5 FM, Heart West on 102.6 FM, Greatest Hits Radio West Somerset on 107.5 FM, and FromeFM, a community based radio station which broadcast to the town on 96.6 FM. The town's local newspaper is the Frome Times.

== Sport and leisure ==
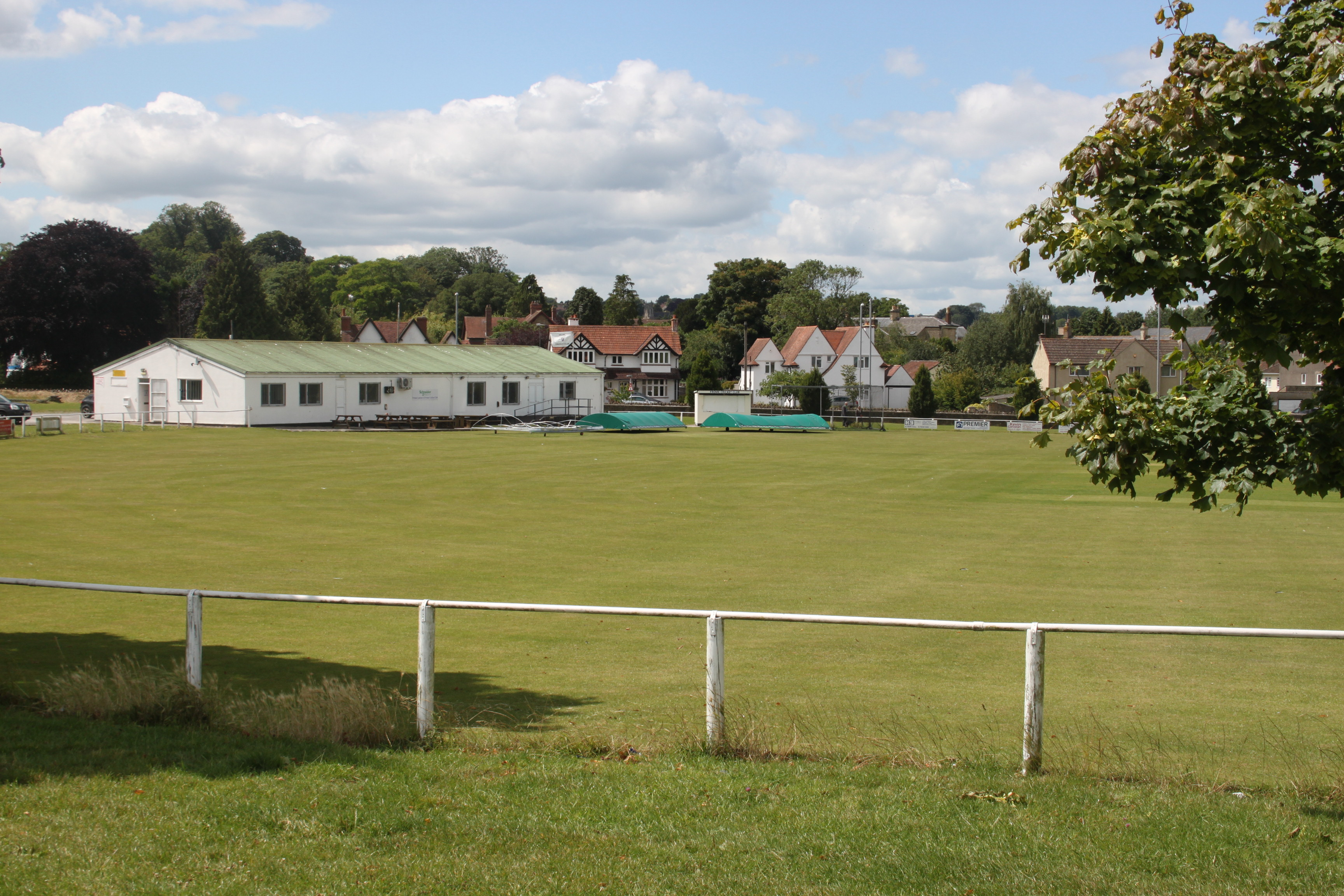
Agricultural Showground cricket pitch

The Leisure Centre offers a wide range of activities including swimming, indoor bowls, squash and a gym, originally opened in 1974, and refurbished through October 2015 to May 2016. There are water based sports including the Frome and Warminster Dive Club, and Canoe Club. There is an inland diving centre near Frome at Vobster.

Victoria Park offers sports such as Bowls, Tennis, Putting, Skateboard ramps and a Children's Playground. The Millennium Green has several marked walks and a picnic area close to a semi wild open space for local wildlife. The town is at one end of the Mendip Way which is an 80 kilometres (50 mi) long-distance footpath across the Mendip Hills from Weston-super-Mare.

Badgers Hill is the home of Frome Town F.C., which in 2009 was promoted from the Western Football League into the Southern Football League. The team were promoted again in 2011 into the Southern Football League Premier Division. The Frome Town ladies' team also play at Badgers Hill. Frome Town F.C. has Youth/Mini section, launched in the 2010–11 season, which achieved FA Community Club Status in 2012. The Youth section covers players of all abilities from under 6's to under 18's. Starting in September 2019, the Frome Town 'Education and Football Academy' (part of a Southern League Football Academy) will offer the BTEC in Sport Level 3 qualification.

Frome Cricket Club plays cricket at the Agricultural Showgrounds on the Bath side of town. The club was formed in 1925 and plays in the West of England Premier League: Somerset Division. Somerset County Cricket Club used to use the ground and Harold Gimblett made his debut at the venue in May 1935. The club's most famed players are Colin Herbert Dredge, who played county cricket 209 times for Somerset from 1976 to 1988 and was known as the "Demon of Frome", Mark Harmon, who played for both Somerset and Kent and still plays for Frome Cricket Club and Alex Barrow, who played for Somerset, represented England at under 19 level and is now a player/coach for Exeter Cricket Club.

Founded in 1883, Frome Rugby Football Club has been at the very heart of Rugby Union in Somerset playing at Gypsy Lane. It has four senior teams and a thriving mini and junior section which ranges from Under 6's to Under 16's along with an Academy XV. The First XV, Second XV and Third XV all play in the English Rugby Union South West Division Championship; the First XV play in Wadworth 6X Southern Counties South league, the Second XV in Wadworth 6X Dorset & Wilts 2 North and the Third XV in The Bath Merit Table. The Fourth XV Veterans, known as the Cavalry, and the Fourth XV Academy play friendly, social fixtures against other local sides.

Two cycling clubs operate in the town: the Frome CTC, nicknamed the Coffee and Tea-Cake Club, and the Frome & District Wheelers. E-bikes are available for hire, courtesy of a Town Council initiative. The Frome Cobble Wobble is an individually timed bicycle hill climb sprint. It was first organised by the local community, with support from Councillor Alvin Horsfall, to celebrate the stage 5 of the 2009 Tour of Britain, which started in Frome. The last race was held in 2025, after a 13-year hiatus.

The Guinness World Record for the most people to row 500m each, in a 24-hour relay on one indoor rowing machine, was held in Frome when 678 rowers broke the record in June 2018. An unofficial record was achieved in June 2019 for the highest number of players in a continuous eight-hour game of skittles, 593 individuals taking part.

The Frome Half Marathon has taken place every year since 2001, in mid-July. It includes 10k, 5k and Family Fun Runs.

Frome is an accredited Walkers are Welcome town since 2018. A list of walks and guides is available. Guided walks on a range of topics are now online. The East Mendip Way passes through Frome and gives access to an 80-kilometre (50 mi) long-distance footpath across the Mendip Hills.

== Notable people ==
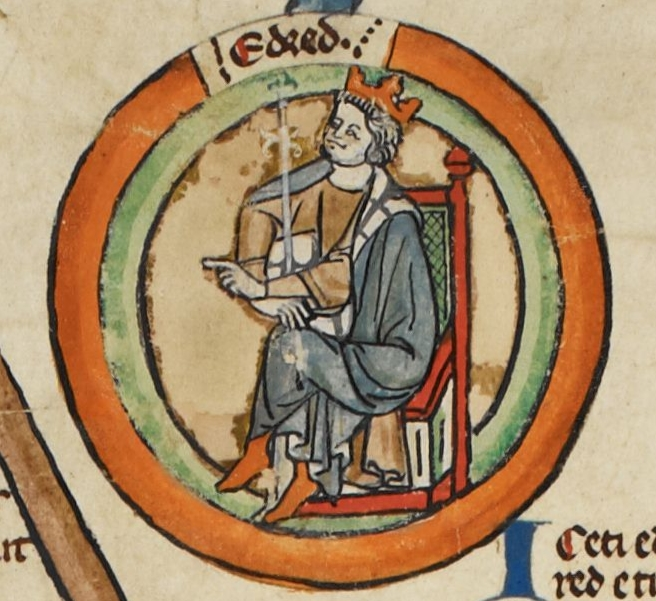
Eadred

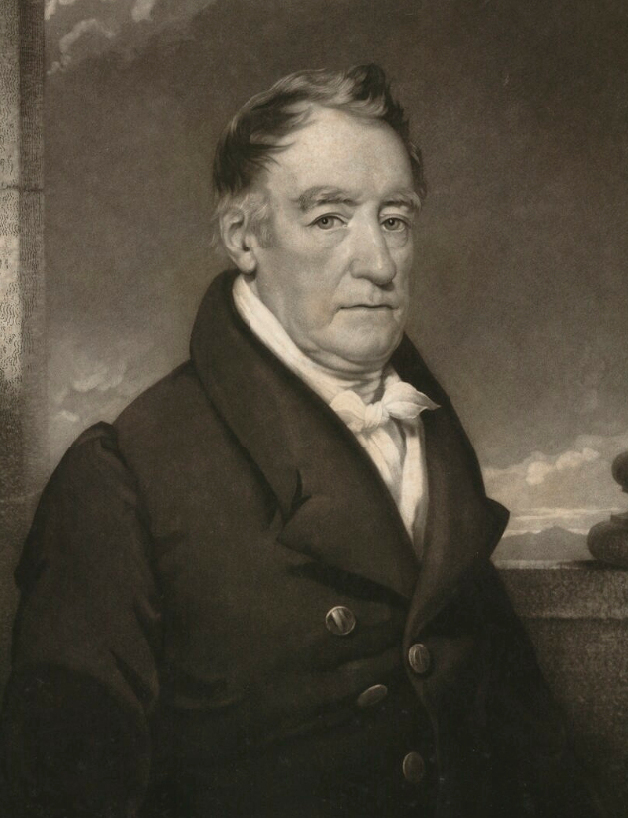
Sir Charles Wilkins, 1830

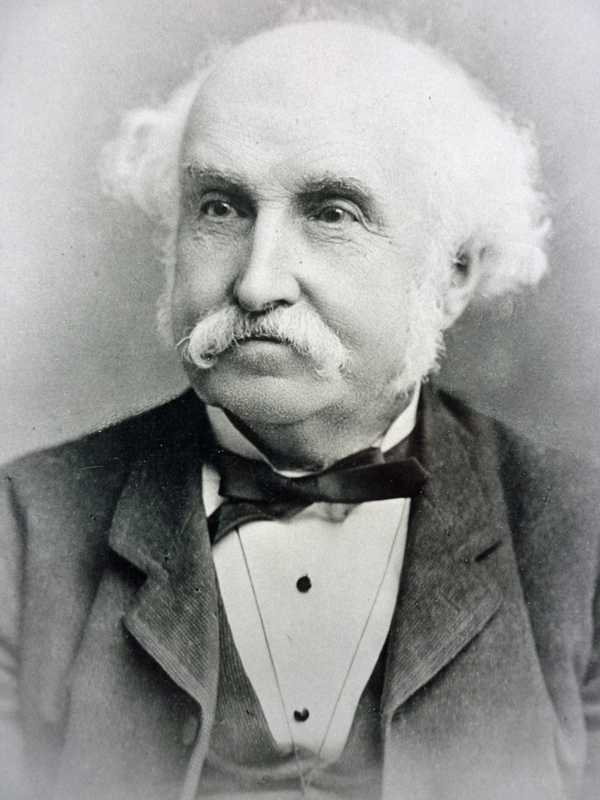
John Webb Singer

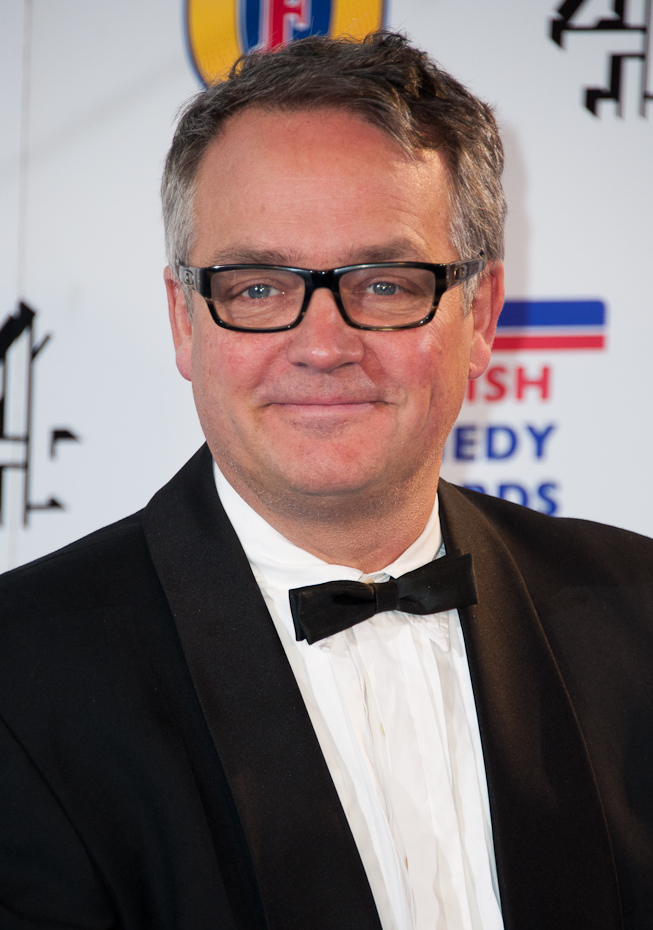
Charlie Higson, 2013

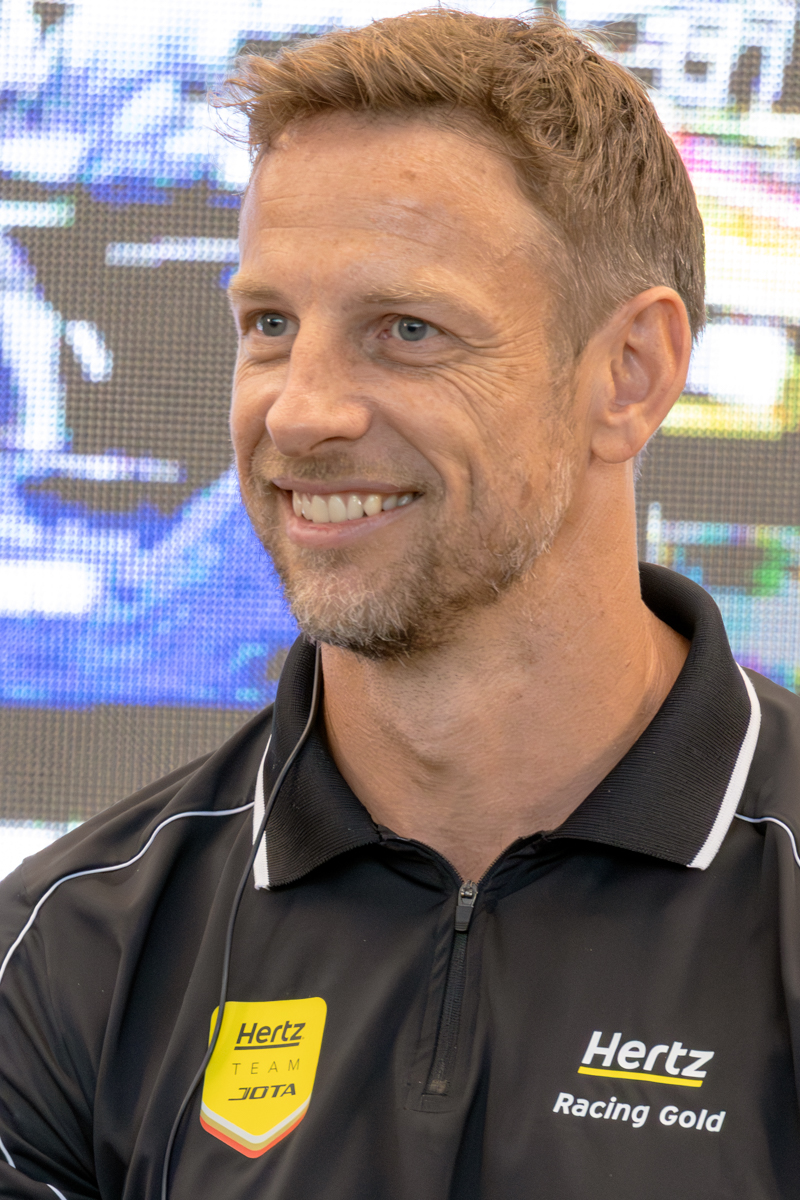
Jenson Button, 2024

- Eadred (or Edred) (923–955), King of England between 944 and 955, died locally.
- Joseph Glanvill (1636–1680), philosopher and Vicar of Frome from 1662 to 1666.
- Elizabeth Singer Rowe (1674–1737), poet and devotional writer, first published by John Dunton.
- Samuel Bowden (fl. 1733–1761), physician and poet.
- Charles Wilkins (1749–1836), typographer and scholar, translated Bhagavad Gita into English.
- Edward Fryer (1761–1826), an English physician.
- Edward Cockey (1781–1860), an industrial entrepreneur from a local family of metalworkers.
- John Sheppard (1785–1879), religious writer, from the Sheppard family of clothiers.
- Francis Close (1797–1882), rector of Cheltenham (1826–1856) and Dean of Carlisle (1856–1881).
- Henry Thomas Ryall (1811–1867), royal engraver to Queen Victoria.
- Charles Ball (1813-1876), founder of the Ball & Welch department store chain in Australia,
- Henry Minchin Noad (1815–1877), chemist and physicist.
- John Webb Singer (1819–1904), bronze art founder, made ecclesiastical metalwork, was born, worked and died in Frome.
- Christina Rossetti (1830–1894), poet, sister of Dante Gabriel Rossetti, helped run a local day school, 1853–1854.
- Edward Robert Festing (1839–1912), army officer and first Director of the Science Museum, London.
- Benjamin Baker (1840–1907), civil engineer, built the Forth Bridge., commemorated by a Frome Society for Local Study plaque.
- Edward Cruttwell (1857–1933), civil engineer, resident engineer for construction of Tower Bridge.
- Maud Cruttwell, (1859–1939), English artist, art historian, writer and biographer.
- Parfitt Brothers, architects in Brooklyn, New York; including Albert E. Parfitt (1863-1926)
- Alice Seeley Harris (1870–1970), documentary photographer, missionary and human rights activist, lived in Frome 1882-1888.
- Frederick B. Kiddle (1874–1951), pianist, organist and accompanist.
- William Henry Reed (1875–1942), violinist, composer and biographer of Edward Elgar.
- Wilfred Dolby Fuller (1893-1947), WWI Victoria Cross recipient, in the Grenadier Guards, died locally.
- Charles Oatley (1904–1996), developer of one of the first commercial scanning electron microscopes.
- Kathleen Vellacott-Jones (1907–1972), a British-Canadian journalist and photographer.
- Guy Green (1913–2005), film director, screenwriter, and cinematographer, won an Oscar for Great Expectations.
- Lois Maxwell (1927–2007), played Miss Moneypenny in the James Bond films from 1962 to 1985, lived in Frome, 1994 to 2001.
- James Laurenson (1940–2024), New Zealand stage and screen actor actor, lived in the town.
- Pee Wee Ellis (1941–2021), saxophonist, composer and arranger, lived locally for 30 years.
- Charlie Higson (born 1958), actor, comedian, author and former singer of The Fast Show.
- Richard Vranch (born 1959), actor, comedian, writer and musician of Whose Line Is It Anyway?.
- Simon King (born 1962), naturalist and broadcaster, has a business in the town.
- Huey Morgan (born 1968), American lead singer/guitarist from Fun Lovin' Criminals and radio presenter on BBC Radio 6 Music and BBC Radio 2, lived in Frome until 2018.
- John Harris (born 1969), journalist, writer and critic, lives in Frome.
- Pearl Lowe (born 1970), English fashion and textiles designer, lives in Frome.
- Danny Goffey (born 1974), drummer with the band Supergrass, lives in Frome.
- Cara Dillon (born 1975), Irish folk singer and husband, musician and record producer Sam Lakeman, have lived in Frome since 2002.
- Anna Friel (born 1976), actress.
- Kerry Wilkinson (born 1980), author and sports journalist, went to Oakfield Middle School and Frome Community College.
- Siobhan Thompson (born 1984), sketch comedian and comedy writer, grew up in Frome.

=== Sport ===
- Box Case (1895–1969), cricketeer, played 257 first-class cricket matches for Somerset
- Colin Dredge (born 1954) cricketer, played 194 First-class cricket games for Somerset.
- Kate Rew (born 1969), author and wild swimmer, lives in the town.
- Jenson Button (born 1980), Formula One racing driver and 2009 world champion; went to Selwood Middle School, now Selwood Academy,; Jenson Avenue, is named after him, and a new bridge over the River Frome. In May 2010, Button was awarded freedom of the town.

== Twin towns ==
Frome has three twin towns: Château-Gontier in France, Murrhardt in Germany and Rabka-Zdrój in Poland.
