= St Mary's Church, Frome =

Church in Somerset, England

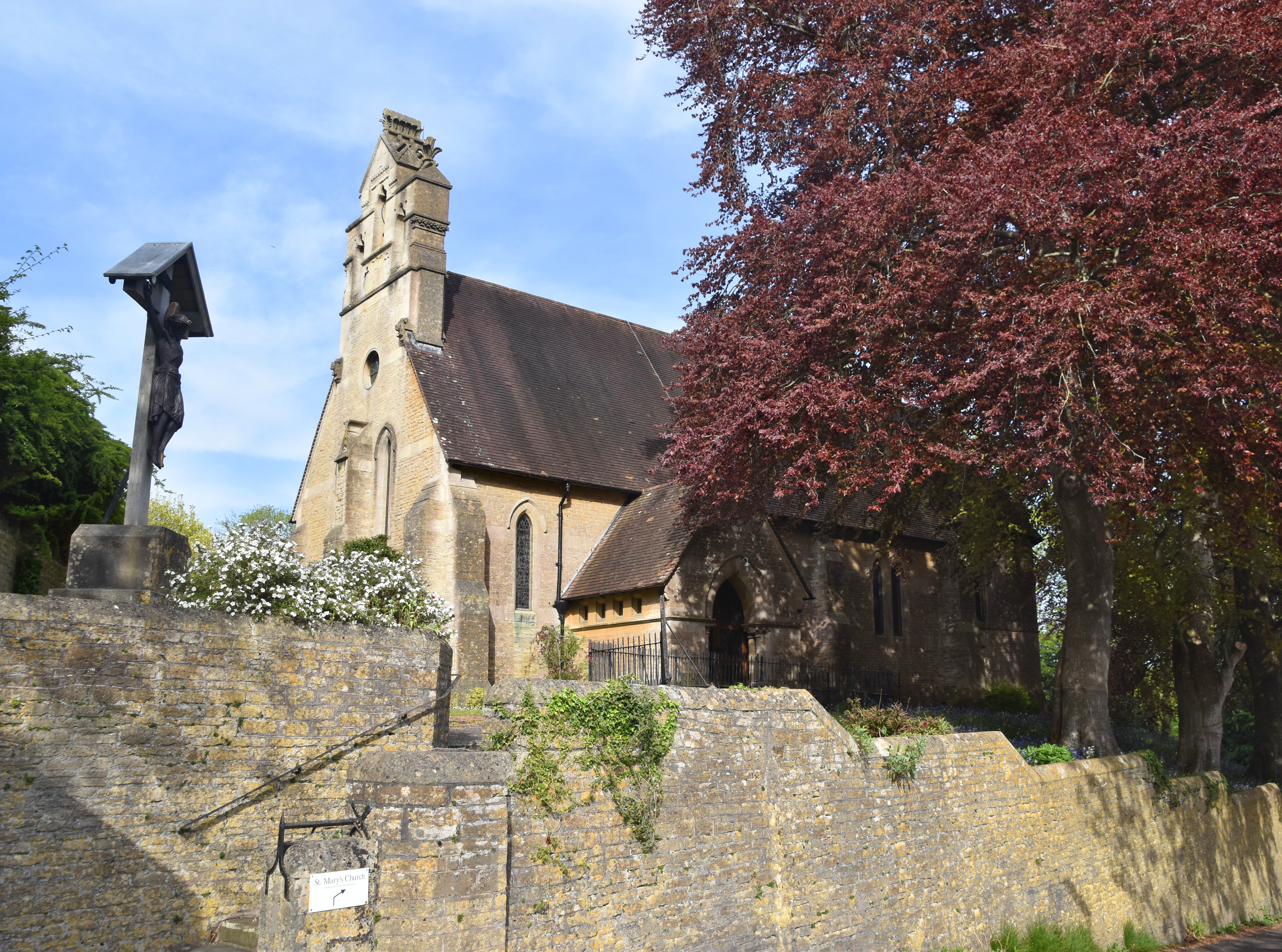

Religion
- Affiliation: Church of England
- Ecclesiastical or organisational status: Active
- Year consecrated: 1864

Location
- Location: Frome, Somerset, England
- Interactive map of St Mary's Church, Frome
- Coordinates: 51.2377°N 2.3212°W

Architecture
- Architect: Charles Edmund Giles
- Type: Church
- Style: Early English

St Mary's Church is a Church of England parish church in Frome, Somerset, England. It was built in 1862–1864 to the designs of C. E. Giles and is a Grade II listed building. The church is built of local stone with dressings in Bath stone, and has an adjoining schoolroom and rectory.

== History ==
St Mary's was built as a chapel of ease to the parish church of St John the Baptist, and in particular to serve the districts of Welshmill, Fromefield, Innox Hill and Spring Gardens. The church was built at the expense of an anonymous benefactor, and the required plot of land was donated by Sir Charles Mordaunt. Other sites for the church, including at Fromefield and Clink, had been suggested, but the chosen site was favoured as it was considered more accessible to all of the surrounding districts.

The plans for the church were drawn up by C. E. Giles of Taunton, which included an adjoining schoolroom and rectory. The corner stone was laid by the vicar of Frome, the Rev. William James Early Bennett, on 24 June 1862. The church was built by Messrs. Brown, with Mr. Tookey as clerk of the works. The carving work was carried out by Mr. Ezard of Bath and Mr J. W. Singer supplied the ironwork. St Mary's was consecrated by the Bishop of Bath and Wells, the Right Rev. Robert Eden, on 26 January 1864.

In 1952, a large anchor was installed in the church as a hanging rood by Rev. T. Warrilow. The window east of the south porch had stained glass installed in memory of Tom Russell Warrilow in 1969.

== Architecture ==
St Mary's is built of hammer-dressed and pointed local stone, with dressings in Bath stone. It is made up of a nave, chancel, organ chapel, vestry and south porch. Adjoining the church on its north side is a schoolroom and classroom, now used as the church hall, and adjoining the hall is the two-storey rectory. On the roof above the chancel arch is a bell turret, surmounted by an iron gilded cross, and the west gable also has a bell-cot for three bells.

The chancel has a semi-octagonal form, with single-light windows by Clayton and Bell. The nave is lighted by four two-light windows and the organ chapel is fronted by a two-light window. Horwood of Mells painted the glass of the single-light window over the font. The church's west end has two one-light windows, with a circular light in the gable. A small screen of Bath stone divides the chancel and nave, with columns of dressed red Mansfield stone. The altar space is laid with Mintons encaustic tiles, and the altar steps of polished limestone. The aisle is also laid with Mintons encaustic tiles and the flooring under the seating is of wood. The roof is of open stained timber.

Original fittings from the 19th century include an octagonal stone pulpit, a brass lectern and a font with a central column supported by four marble shafts. The organ was built by Vowles of Bristol. The carved reredos is made up of three panels, each divided by Devon marble columns, and surmounted by a cornice with a carved finial.
