= Frome Town Hall =

Municipal building in Frome, Somerset, England

Coordinates: 51.2294°N 2.3250°W

Frome Town Hall is a municipal building in Christchurch Street West in Frome, a town in Somerset, in England. It currently accommodates the offices and meeting place of Frome Town Council.

== History ==
Following significant population growth, largely associated with the cloth trade, a local board of health was appointed in Frome in 1865. The board was initially accommodated in rooms in Bath Street in Frome. In the late 1880s, the local board of health decided to commission public offices to accommodate the board of guardians, who administered the Poor Law, as well as its own meetings. The site they selected, which was on the south side of Christchurch Street West, was acquired from the local landowner, John Thynne, 4th Marquess of Bath whose seat was at Longleat, for £178.

Work on the new building started in 1890. It was designed by Halliday & Anderson in the Renaissance style, built by Joseph Bird of Radstock in local stone at a cost of £3,435, and was completed in 1892. The clock was donated by the chairman of the board, Edward Flatman, and designed and manufactured by Smith of Derby Group. In 1894, the local board of health was succeeded by Frome Urban District Council, which assumed responsibility for the administration of the town. Although the new urban district council was initially based at the public offices in Christchurch Street West, in 1952, it relocated to larger premises at North Hill House in North Parade, where it remained until it was abolished.

Meanwhile, Frome Rural District Council, established in 1894 to administer the surrounding rural area, continued to operate from the public offices in Christchurch Street West. Following local government re-organisation in 1974, the building in Christchurch Street West passed to Somerset County Council, which used it for the provision of social services. Frome Town Council then acquired the building from Somerset County Council for £275,000 in 2015. The building was restored to a design by NVB architects, and the town council relocated from its former offices in Palmer Street to the building in Christchurch Street West in 2017. In addition to the council chamber and offices, it also provides offices for various charities and community groups.

== Architecture ==
The two-storey building is constructed of stone. The design involves an asymmetrical main frontage of nine bays facing onto Christchurch Street West. The left-hand section of three bays is fenestrated with pedimented sash windows with Gibbs surrounds on the ground floor and with plain surrounds on the first floor; it is surmounted by a balstraded parapet, a central panel flanked by scrolls and topped by an acroterion, and a pair of corner finials. The central section of three bays, which is recessed, is fenestrated by sash windows in a similar style and contains an ornate porch in the right-hand bay. The porch is formed by archway flanked by pairs of Corinthian order pilasters supporting an entablature, a balustraded parapet and a pair of corner finials. The right-hand section of three bays is fenestrated by sash windows in a similar style except that the windows in the central bay are mullioned; it is surmounted by a balustraded parapet, a central clock flanked by scrolls, and a pair of corner finials. Internally, the principal room is the council chamber which is 44 feet (13 m) long and 25 feet (7.6 m) wide. The ground floor has a mosaic floor.
