= Edward Fryer =

British doctor

Edward Fryer, M.D. (1761–1826) was an English physician.

== Life ==
Fryer was born at Frome, Somerset. He was sent to the grammar school there, and then apprenticed to a general practitioner of medicine in Wiltshire. He studied medicine in London, Edinburgh, and Leyden, and graduated M.D. at the University of Leyden 29 January 1785. He travelled in Europe until 1790, when he came to London, and was admitted a licentiate of the Royal College of Physicians.

He became physician to the Duke of Sussex, and resided in Upper Charlotte Street, where he died 9 January 1826.

== Works ==
He attended James Barry, the painter, in his last illness, and wrote his life, a work which was published in 1825.
