= Frome Museum =

Local history museum in Frome, Somerset

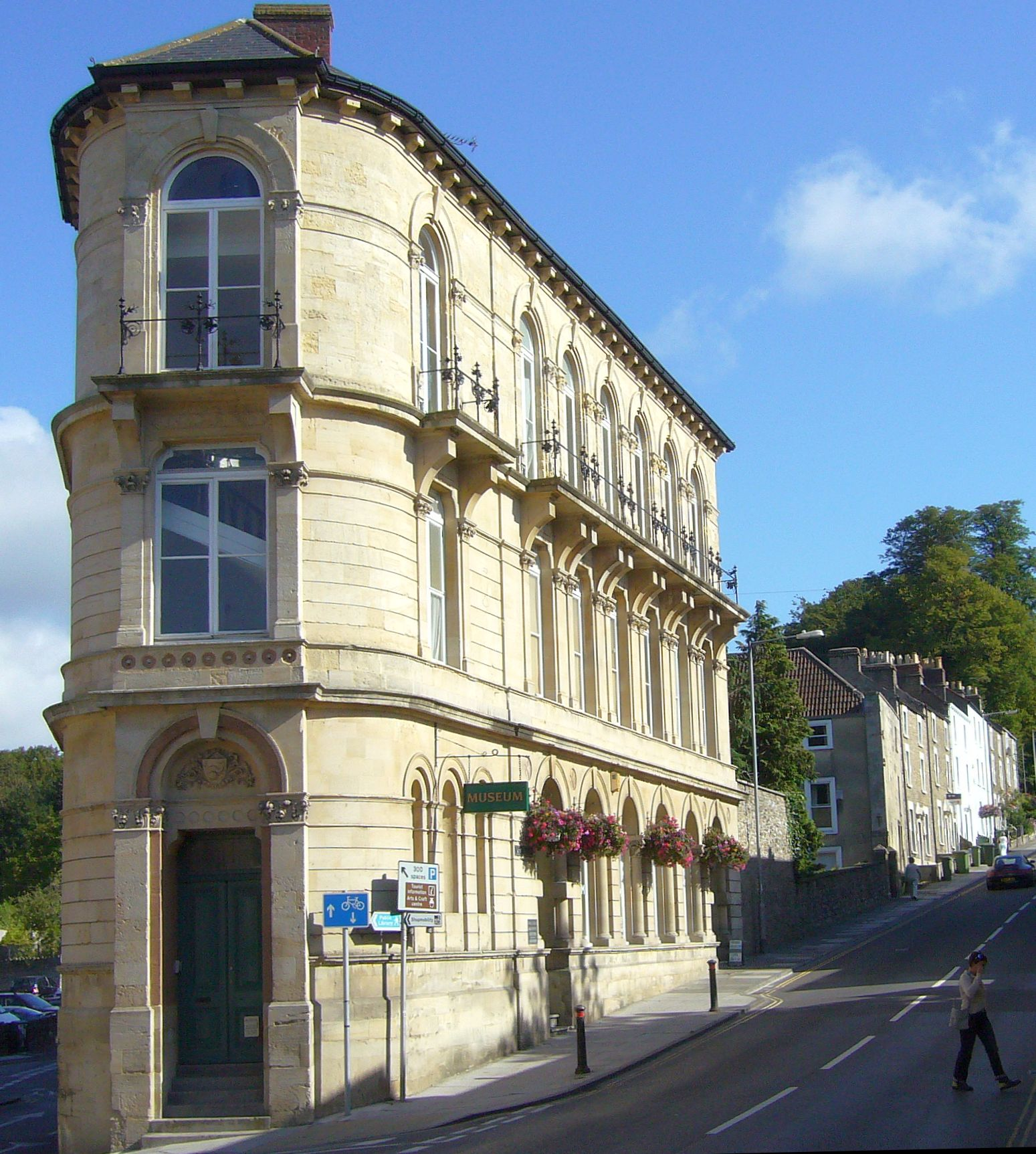

- Location within Somerset and the United Kingdom
- Location: North Parade, Frome, Somerset, England
- Coordinates: 51.2328°N 2.3191°W
- Collection size: approximately 23,000 items
- Website: https://frome-museum.org/

Frome Museum in Frome, Somerset, England houses a collection of local history and has a particularly important collection of artefacts from the bronze foundry of J. W. Singer.

== Collections ==
There are two display rooms and a library, with displays of many local industrial artefacts, maps & photos. The collections include local archaeological and historical artefacts related to the historical development of Frome and district. A display is devoted to the Butler and Tanner printing works in the town, including an old printing press. Another display exhibits photographs, diagrams, plans and tools from James Fussel's Ironworks of Mells. A Cockey lamp is on show, with its art nouveau style; more than 60 can still be seen around the town. Other displays show items from Bussman Cooper (later Beswicks), the Marston House Fire Engine, local blacksmithing, a Chemist's Shop from Bath Street and a collection of Victorian and later costumes.

== Singers ==
There is a large selection of photographs, glass negatives and art metalworks from the local company Messrs J.W.Singer & Sons Ltd. John Webb Singer was born in Frome and established his foundry in 1851. The company made brass ornaments for local churches and became known through the Oxford Movement within the Church of England which led to increasing demand for church ornaments. In addition to church work, the company developed the facilities and expertise to create large statues, which were exported around the world. One of the first such statues was a copy of General Gordon riding a camel. The company was also responsible for the bronze statue of Boudica with her daughters in her war chariot (furnished with scythes after the Persian fashion), commissioned by Prince Albert and executed by Thomas Thornycroft. It was not cast in bronze until 1902, 17 years after Thornycrofts death, and now stands next to Westminster Bridge and the Houses of Parliament, London. The statue of Lady Justice on the dome above the Old Bailey was executed by the British sculptor, F. W. Pomeroy and cast by Singers. The statue of Alfred the Great at Winchester was a further commission.

== Building ==
The Italianate building was built as a Literary and Scientific Institute in 1865 for John Sinkins. The architect was J Hine and the builders were Carr and Pickford. It is a Grade II listed building. Conservation of the building was undertaken by Chedburn Dudley in conjunction with the Frome Historic Building Preservation Trust.
