= Frome Cobble Wobble =

Bicycle sprint in Frome, Somerset, England

The Frome Cobble Wobble, established in 2009, is an individually timed bicycle hill climb sprint in Frome, Somerset, England. It was first organised by Andrew Denham involving the local community, with support from Councillor Alvin Horsfall.

The inaugural edition was created to celebrate Stage 5 of the Tour of Britain, which started in Frome that year . Although the event was intended to become an annual fixture in the town’s calendar, it entered a 12-year hiatus before being revived in 2025.

The course begins at the bottom of Stony Street, takes a sharp turn as it joins Catherine Hill, and finishes at the end of the cobbles the top of the hill. The total length of the course is 179 yards, and the average gradient is 1:7.

== Previous winners ==
Year	Name	Time
2009	Neil Cousins	23.54
2010	Chris Akrigg	21.51
2011	Lewis Lacey	22.71
2012	Michal Prokop	22.96
2025	King: Charlie Hoy Queen: Amelie Eaton	23.54 34.52
