= Kathleen Vellacott-Jones =

British-Canadian journalist and photographer

Kathleen Vellacott-Jones (1907–1972) was a British-Canadian journalist and photographer who reported for British and Australian news services and published articles and photographs on behalf of the Territory of Papua New Guinea.

== Early life ==
Kathleen Emma Jones, (usually known as Kathleen or Kate Vellacott-Jones), was born in Frome, Somerset, England on September 21, 1907, the daughter of Philip Jones and his second wife Ellen. The family emigrated to Canada in 1921–22 to improve her father's health with the intention of farming land in Lloydminster, Saskatchewan. Kathleen spent her vacations in the nearby Canadian Rockies, using these experiences as sources for her newspaper articles. She returned to England in the late 1920s to attend university and pursue journalism as a career.

== Move to Australia and wartime service ==
Vellacott-Jones travelled to Australia in 1937 and worked as a journalist for many Queensland newspapers as well as doing radio work for the Australian Broadcasting Corporation (ABC). Many of her articles and talks for radio described the differences between Canada and Australia. Following the declaration of war in 1939, Vellacott-Jones returned to London where she continued to submit articles for Australian newspapers detailing the war effort and wrote for a number of British daily newspapers. She returned to Australia after 1940, volunteering as a fruit picker during vacation and was a regular contributor to Australian radio programs. In 1945 she joined the British Women's Auxiliary Territorial Service (WAS) as a second lieutenant and worked extensively in Burma and Japan until 1946. She published a book, Ticket to Burma in 1952, detailing her experiences as part of the WAS during the latter part of World War II.

== Work in Papua New Guinea ==
Vellacott-Jones took up a position with the ABC's Papua New Guinea office in 1949. She was one of the first women to hike the Kokoda Track following the end of World War II. She was on site to report the news when Mt Lamington in PNG erupted in 1951. From 1953-1965 she was in charge of Public Relations for the Territory of Papua New Guinea as it moved towards independence. In this role she published news for the Australian and British press and took extensive photographs of the region, in particular the highlands of the Tari community.

== Legacy ==
Kathleen Vellacott-Jones returned to England to live. She died in Nottingham, England on November 5, 1972. She did not marry and was survived by a number of siblings and her extended family. Vellacott-Jones’ extensive photographic collection and some films from her time reporting for the PNG government are lodged in the University of Queensland Library in the manuscript collection of Fryer Library.
