= John Blue House =

John Blue House may refer to:

- John Blue House (Aberdeen, North Carolina), listed on the NRHP in Moore County, North Carolina
- John Blue House (Laurinburg, North Carolina), listed on the NRHP in North Carolina

== See also ==
- Blue House (disambiguation)
