= Mark Harman (cricketer) =

English cricketer

Personal information
- Full name: Mark David Harman
- Born: 30 June 1964 (age 62); Aylesbury, Buckinghamshire
- Batting: Right-handed
- Bowling: Right-arm off-break
- Role: Bowler

Domestic team information
- Years: Team
- 1986–1987: Somerset
- 1988–1989: Kent
- FC debut: 20 August 1986 Somerset v Sussex
- Last FC: 20 June 1989 Kent v Somerset
- List A debut: 24 June 1987 Somerset v Buckinghamshire
- Last List A: 21 August 1988 Kent v Gloucestershire

Career statistics
Competition	First-class	List A
Matches	23	4
Runs scored	201	10
Batting average	12.56	5.00
100s/50s	0/0	0/0
Top score	41	8*
Balls bowled	3,311	156
Wickets	43	3
Bowling average	31.60	49.66
5 wickets in innings	3	0
10 wickets in match	0	0
Best bowling	5/55	2/58
Catches/stumpings	16/–	1/–
- Source: CricInfo, 27 May 2011

Mark David Harman (born 30 June 1964) ia former English cricketer who played first-class cricket for Somerset County Cricket Club and Kent County Cricket Club between 1986 and 1989. He was born in Aylesbury in Buckinghamshire in 1964.

Harman made his first appearance for Somerset's Second XI in 1981 before he was 17, but had to wait more than five years before he made a first-team appearance: the stumbling-block to his career was the presence in the Somerset side of Vic Marks, a much better batsman and an occasional Test off-spinner. In two seasons of first-team cricket with Somerset he played only nine first-class and three limited-overs matches. At the end of the 1987 season, he moved to Kent.

Playing for Kent brought somewhat more regular first-team cricket, although Harman was largely restricted to the first-class team, playing only one List A match in his two years with the county. The 1988 season brought his two best bowling performance, taking five wickets for 55 runs against Oxford University. Having played in half of Kent's first-class matches in 1988 Harman reverted to being a fringe player in 1989. He had his best match return with nine wickets for 136 runs against Cambridge University but was picked for only one other match, and at the end of the season he left the staff to take up a career in accountancy.

Harman has continued to play club cricket for Frome Cricket Club. He has coached sides at the club and was chair the club's Cricket Committee in 2016 as well as playing alongside his son in club matches.
