= Blue House, Frome =

Building in Somerset, England

The Blue House
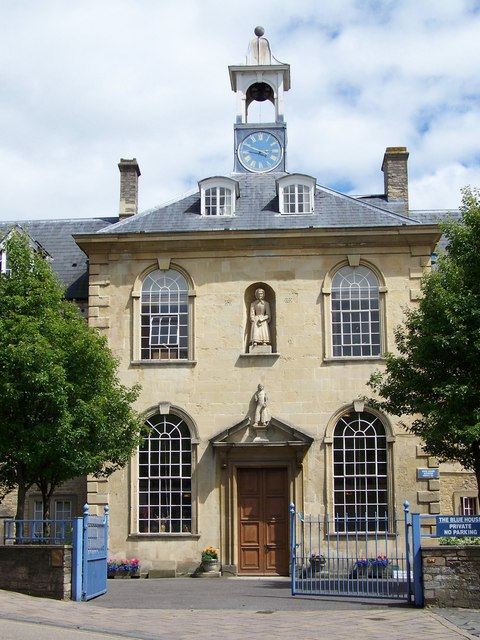

- Location within Somerset

General information
- Location: Frome, England
- Coordinates: 51.2306°N 2.320°W
- Completed: 1726

The Blue House in Frome, Somerset, England, was built in 1726 and has been designated as a Grade I listed building.

The Blue House, located adjacent to the town bridge, was formerly the Bluecoat School and Almshouses, so named due to the colour of the school uniforms.

Built in 1726 at a cost of £1,401 8s 9d, it replaced a previous almshouse dating from 1461 (and rebuilt in 1621). The Blue House provided accommodation for 20 female widows, and schooling for 20 boys, and the front of the building is adorned by two statues, one of a man, colloquially known as "Billy Ball", and one a woman called "Nancy Guy", indicating the building's dual role. Its role as a school ceased in 1921, and it now provides studio and one bedroom flats for 17 elderly residents.

== See also ==
- List of Grade I listed buildings in Mendip
