= Co-Wheels =

Car club in the UK

Co-Wheels is a car club operator which claims to have the largest car club fleet in the United Kingdom. It is based in Newcastle upon Tyne, and owned and financed by the Chinese manufacturer SAIC. Co-Wheels was founded in 2008 and now has 800 vehicles in 70 UK towns and cities.

== Vehicles ==
Their vehicles include the MG ZS and MG 5 which are both SAIC products, and electric vehicles such as the Renault Zoe.
