= Frome Festival =

Annual festival in Frome, Somerset, UK

- Frome Festival Opening Procession 2005
- Genre: Music festival
- Locations: Frome, Somerset, England
- Years active: annual
- Founded: 2000
- Founder: Martin Bax

The Frome Festival (/ˈfruːm/, FROOM) is festival of music and culture held annually in Frome, Somerset, England since 2000.

Martin Bax, a former mayor of the town, conceived the Frome Festival and ran it from its inaugural occurrence in 2000 until 2007, for which he received the MBE. In 2008 Martin Dimery, was appointed as his successor.

The festival programme offers classical music, jazz, folk to indie, literature and drama, film, dance, workshops and free events.

== Venues ==
More than 160 events are held at various venues in and around the town. These include the two theatres in Frome: The Memorial Theatre which was built in 1924 in memory of the fallen of the First World War, whilst the 240-seat Merlin Theatre is part of the Frome Community College campus.

The Cheese and Grain, a former farm produce warehouse which was converted into a market and concert hall in 1997, has a capacity of up to 800 and hosts regular pop concerts. Frome's only cinema, the Westway, is in Cork Street in the town centre. There is also an arts centre, The Black Swan.

== Festival events ==
In 2005, Van Morrison played to three thousand in the grounds of Marston House a nearby stately home. Steeleye Span appeared and more than two hundred players and singers performed Elgar’s The Dream of Gerontius, at the festival's annual Summer School.

2006 welcomed Paul Merton, and also included Tony Benn, Roy Bailey, The Troggs, Barry Cryer, Miles Kington, Peter Donohoe, The Mangledwurzels, Rory McLeod and John Tams.

In 2009, 187 events took place over the ten days, including The Levellers, The Imagined Village, Imelda May, Adrian Edmondson’s band The Bad Shepherds, and Still Black Still Proud, starring Pee Wee Ellis, South Africa's The Mahotella Queens, and London-based Ghanaian rapper Ty. The ninth Frome Festival paid special tribute to Benjamin Baker, the Frome engineer who designed the Forth Railway Bridge, with a series of talks and exhibitions.
