= Frome Community College =

Location
- Bath Road; Frome, Somerset, BA11 2HQ; England; 51°14′36″N 2°18′41″W

Information
- Type: Community school
- Established: 1974 (school on site since 1921)
- Local authority: Somerset
- Department for Education URN: 123862 Tables
- Ofsted: Reports
- Head teacher: Emma Reynolds
- Age: 13 to 18
- Enrolment: 1,213 (December 2021)
- Houses: Saturn; Mars; Neptune; Venus
- Website: www.fromecollege.org

Frome Community College, styled as Frome College, is a comprehensive school in Frome, Somerset, England for students aged 13 to 18.

== History ==
=== Former schools ===
During the Second World War, the Coopers' Company boys' school in south-west Essex, now part of Coopers' Company and Coborn School, was evacuated to the school in October 1939, when Frome County School. The Coburn School for Girls was evacuated to Taunton.

Frome County School became Frome Grammar School.

== Admissions ==
Approximately 1,200 were enrolled in December 2021, within the three tier system. Students' studies at the college lead up to GCSE, GNVQ, AS-Level and A-Level qualifications. Adult learning courses are also offered, as well as a nursery for preschool children.

The college contains two distinct year groups. Pre-16 students are those in Years 9, 10 and 11 who are mostly studying for GCSEs. Post-16 students are part of the school's tertiary sector and so are known as sixth form students; they are for the most part studying AS/A-Levels. The site has a large self-contained sixth form building called Frome Futures.

The school was assessed as 'good' in all categories at its last full Ofsted inspection in January 2014, and this was confirmed by a short inspection in April 2018.

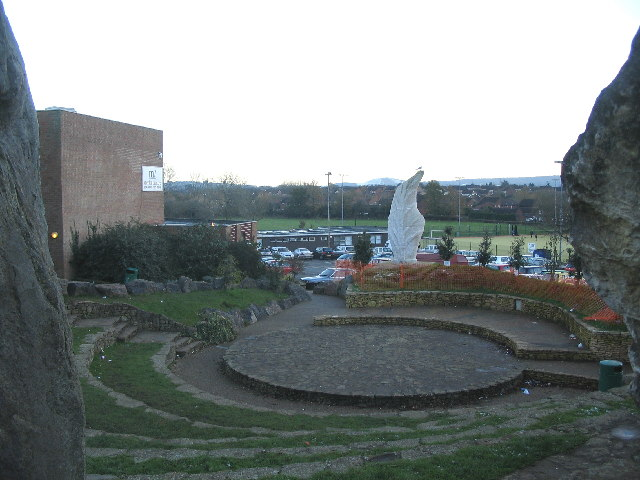
ECOS

== Facilities ==
The college campus incorporates the 240 seat Merlin Theatre and Frome Sport and Fitness, both of which are open to the school's use during school hours. Frome Sport and Fitness offers a wide range of activities including swimming, indoor bowls, squash and a gym.

Uniform for Year 9, 10 and 11 students is a navy blue blazer with purple lining bearing the school logo and the word 'Frome' below, a white shirt, a traditional tie in their house colour (red, orange, green or blue), mid grey trousers or purple and white tartan skirt and black shoes.

== Notable alumni ==
- Jenson Button (born 1980), 2009 Formula One World Drivers' Champion
- Rosa Robson (born 1992), comedian and actress
- Kerry Wilkinson (born 1980), bestselling author
- Luke Hood, founder of UKF Music
