= Ouseley baronets =

Extinct baronetcy in the Baronetage of the United Kingdom

- Escutcheon of the Ouseley baronets of Claremont
- Creation date: 1808
- Status: extinct
- Extinction date: 1889
- Motto: Mors lupi agnis vita, Death of the wolf is life to the lamb

The Ouseley Baronetcy, of Claremont in the County of Hertford, was a title in the Baronetage of the United Kingdom. It was created on 3 October 1808 for the entrepreneur, linguist and diplomat, Gore Ouseley. He was succeeded by his son, the second Baronet. He was a composer, organist, and musicologist. The title became extinct on his death in 1889.

The first Baronet was the brother of Sir William Ouseley and the uncle of Sir William Gore Ouseley.

== Ouseley baronets, of Claremont (1808) ==
- Sir Gore Ouseley, 1st Baronet (1770–1844)
- Sir Frederick Arthur Gore Ouseley, 2nd Baronet (1825–1889). He died unmarried.

Baronetage of the United Kingdom
Preceded by Harland baronets	Ouseley baronets of Claremont; 5 October 1808	Succeeded by Hood baronets
