= Ralph Ouseley (1739) =

Irish antiquarian

- Born: May 7, 1739
- Died: 1803 (aged 63–64)
- Occupation: Antiquarian
- Children: William Ouseley; Gore Ouseley; Joseph Walker Jasper Ouseley

Ralph Ouseley (7 May 1739–1803) was an Irish antiquarian and major in the British Army. (The family name is variously spelled Ouseley or Ousley.)

== Family ==
His brother was John, who was father to Gideon Ouseley and grandfather to major-general Ralph Ouseley.

Ralph himself had several children by two wives. By his first wife Elizabeth Holland of Limerick (whom he married on 1 April 1763) he had three daughters and two sons, William who became an orientalist and Gore who became a Baronet. Elizabeth died on 28 November 1782, and he took a second wife, Mary Collins, with whom he only had 1 surviving child, Joseph Walker Jasper Ouseley who also became an orientalist.

He lived in Limerick and in Dunmore, County Galway.

== Antiquarianism ==
Ralph was a member of the Royal Irish Academy and was a collector and an antiquarian.

He was published several times in the Transactions of the Academy, including for example Ouseley 1788 which recounted his discovery of three Later Bronze Age horns in Carrigogunnell, County Limerick. A partial account of his personal collection of antiquities was reported by Charles Étienne Coquebert de Montbret, who visited him in 1790.

=== Works ===
- Ouseley, Ralph (1 January 1788). "An Account of Three Metal Trumpets, Found in the County of Limerick, in the Year 1787". The Transactions of the Royal Irish Academy. 2: 3–5. JSTOR 30079247.
- Ouseley, Ralph (1787). "An account of the moving of a bog, and the formation of a lake in the Co. of Galway. With 1 plate". The Transactions of the Royal Irish Academy. 2: 3–5. JSTOR 30079226.
