= Church of St John the Baptist, Frome =

Church in Somerset, England

Coordinates: 51°13′48″N 02°19′14″W

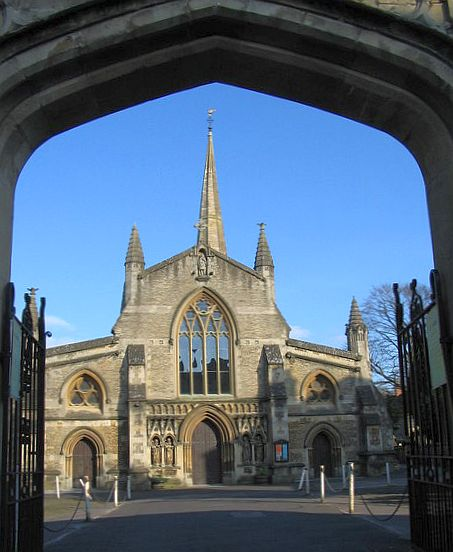
- St John the Baptist, Frome
- Church of St John the Baptist, Frome
- Denomination: Church of England
- Churchmanship: Broad Church
- Website: www.sjfrome.co.uk

History
- Dedication: St John the Baptist

Architecture
- Heritage designation: Grade II* listed building

Administration
- Province: Canterbury
- Diocese: Bath and Wells
- Archdeaconry: Wells
- Parish: Frome

Clergy
- Vicar: Revd Colin Alsbury

The Church of St John the Baptist, Frome is a parish church in the Church of England in Frome within the English county of Somerset. It is a Grade II* listed building.

The first church on the site was founded by Aldhelm around 685 AD The late Saxon building was replaced at end of the 12th century and expanded with addition of chantry chapels up to the time of a major extension of the church around 1420 to its present footprint. In 1852 the controversial priest William James Early Bennett was appointed as the vicar and undertook major changes both in the organisation of the parish and the fabric of the church.

The restoration by Charles Edmund Giles included stained glass by Charles Eamer Kempe and statuary by James Forsyth. The entrance to the church passes a holy well and stone-sculptured Via Crucis (Way of the Cross) depicting seven scenes from the Stations of the Cross. It is unique in the Anglican church in England.

== History ==
The present parish church of St John the Baptist, with its tower and spire, was built between the late 12th and early 15th centuries, replacing an earlier building described by William of Malmesbury in the 1120s as having survived the centuries. The first church of St John the Baptist (in honorem sancti Johannis Baptista) had been established when Aldhelm obtained a grant from Pope Sergius I to establish a foundation of mission priests to spread the faith in Selwood Forest. The earliest, probably timber, church is likely to have shared the same rocky platform as the present church, located between two streams running down the hill on either side, in line with Blindhouse Lane and Gentle Street. By the second half of the 11th century the then stone-built church was one of a number held in plurality by Regenbald, and the church lands merited a separate entry in the Domesday Book. In the 19th century some fragments of masonry possibly dating from 8th or 9th centuries found on the site were set into an old hagioscope, close to the entrance of St Andrew's Chapel; one of them may have been part of a standing cross. Archaeological work in 2021 has identified the location of the earlier church described by William of Malmesbury as being within the Eastern half of the present church nave.

In the 14th and 15th centuries separate chantry chapels to St Andrew, St Nicholas and St Mary the Virgin were established. Around 1418 William Starke was the vicar.

After the removal of stained glass in 1643 as ordered by the Puritans there was a period of neglect of the fabric, and by the early 19th century the church was in need of restoration work. When the south aisle was being rebuilt in the 1860s, stonework interpreted as foundations of arcades and possible Saxon interments were found, but these were quickly covered so as not to delay the rebuilding. There was some restoration of the Chancel and adjoining side chapel, now the Ken Chapel, in the 1840s at the expense of the then patrons, Longleat.

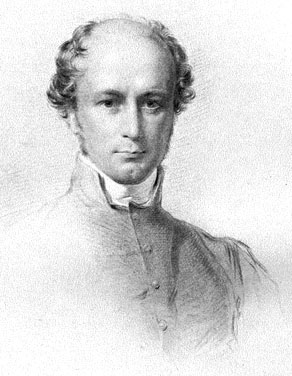
William James Early Bennett (1804-1886)

The controversial priest William James Early Bennett was appointed as the vicar in 1852. Bennett is celebrated for having provoked the decision that the doctrine of the Real Presence is a dogma not inconsistent with the creed of the Church of England. As a leading member of the Oxford Movement he had served as priest at various churches in London including St Barnabas, Pimlico which he resigned in 1851, following doctrinal complaints and a theological dispute with his bishop, Charles Blomfield - after being accused of ritualism.

Within a few years of Bennett's arrival the system of pew privilege, by which the wealthy bought their pews, was abandoned and many of the pews and the galleries were removed. He also divided the parish into 12 districts and established schools, classes, a dispensary and other charities for the population. He set up a choir school for 12 boys and creches for the children of the town's factory workers. He bought property adjoining the grammar school which had been founded at the dissolution of the chantries, merged the sites, and built a new school, now used as the church hall and known as the Bennett Centre. Bennett's publication The Old Church Porch (1854–1862), issued at Frome, formed a prototype for the first parish magazine, although its format was rather academic in parts.

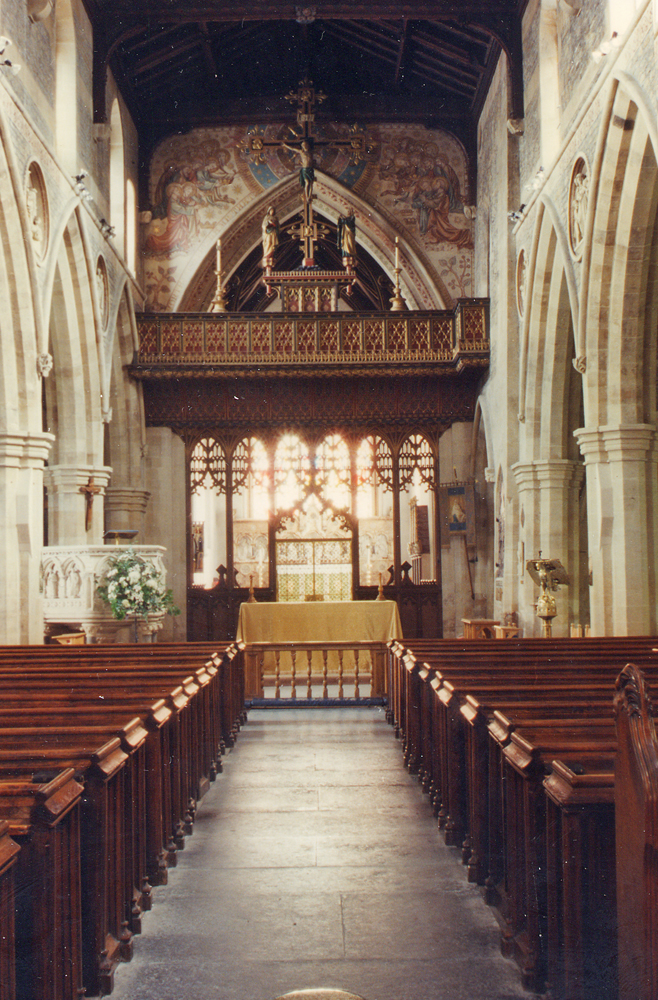
The altar and reredos

In the restoration work of the 1850s and 1860s the principal architect was Charles Edmund Giles. Bennett employed the sculptor James Forsyth to carve statues of saints and the reredos. Medallions set in the spandrels of the nave arches were inspired by Donatello's similar work that Bennett had seen in the Old Sacristy at Florence during his excursion into Europe in 1851. Forsyth was also responsible for the carving of the Via Crucis alongside the steps on the north side of the church.

It was designated as a Grade II* listed building in 1983.

The parish and benefice of Frome (St John the Baptist) is within the archdeaconry of Wells and the Diocese of Bath and Wells.

== Architecture ==
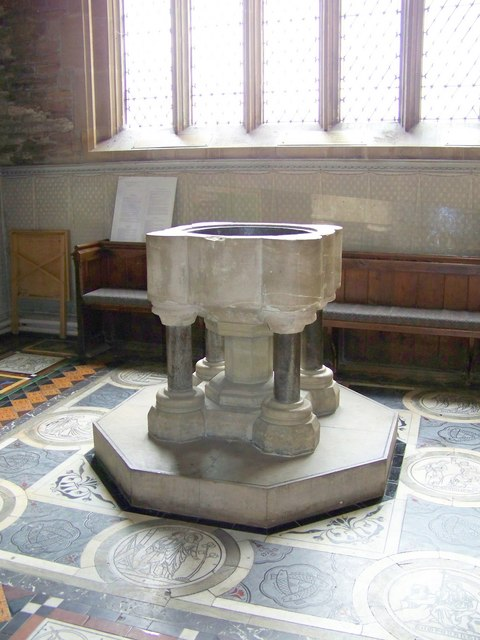
The font surrounded by a pavement showing the seven virtues and seven deadly sins.

The church contains a chancel, Lady chapel and baptistery and has a 7 or 8 bay nave. Fragments of Norman work are left including carved stones at the base of the tower and parts of the arch into the Lady Chapel.

The interior is elaborately adorned with sculptures and stained glass, most of which is by Charles Eamer Kempe. The font was recovered in the nineteenth century from under the floor at the West end of the church and restored, at first in the middle of the nave and then moved by Bennet to the Chapel of St Nicholas which became the baptistry. It is surrounded by a pavement by Clayton & Bell showing the seven virtues and seven deadly sins. A font which had been in use in the present Ken Chapel in the early nineteenth century was given to Christ Church, Frome, after its construction.

There are brass gates to the Chancel and a forged metal screen to the Lady Chapel, complete with gas lamp feature, both locally manufactured by John Webb Singer. There is a fine brass lectern and brass candlesticks in the church, which may also be from Singer's works.

Outside the east end of the church is the tomb of Thomas Ken (July 1637 – 19 March 1711) who was an English cleric who was considered one of the fathers of modern English hymnology and the most eminent of the seven Bishops who refused the oath of Indulgence 1689 to William and Mary and was consequently deprived of his See of Bath and Wells. Hence the symbolism: an empty grave, and empty coffin, outside the church. He is remembered in the Church of England with a Lesser Festival on 8 June. Ken is honoured with a feast day on the liturgical calendar of the Episcopal Church (USA) on 20 March.

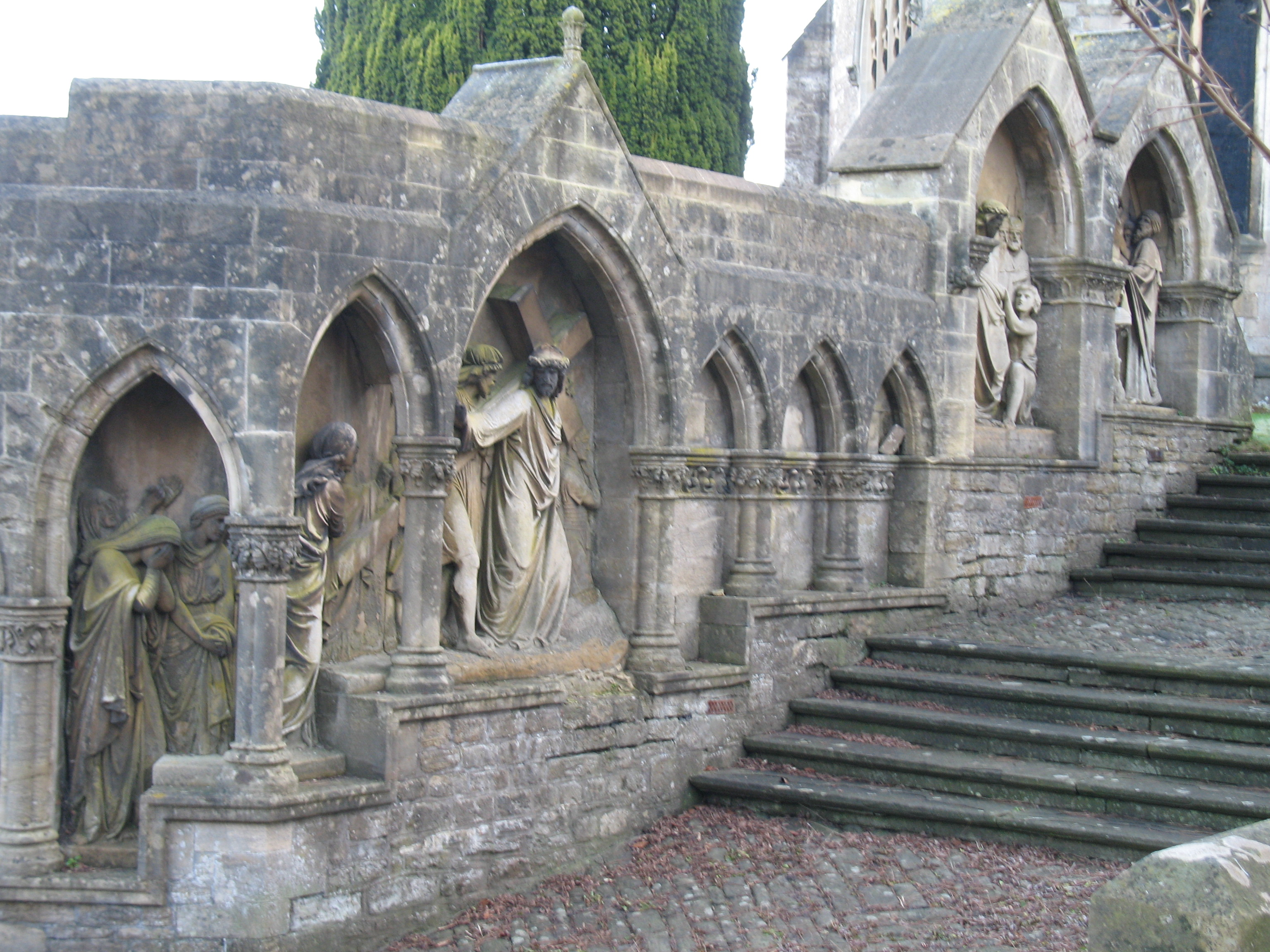
The Via Crucis

The Via Crucis (Way of the Cross) is unique and stone-sculptured. It was added in the 1860s, when several buildings were demolished to make way for it. The carvings by James Forsyth depict seven scenes from the Stations of the Cross. The first shows Christ being condemned by Pontius Pilate, while the second is Christ carrying his cross. The third sculpture illustrates Christ falling under his cross, supported by Simon of Cyrene. The next tableau is of Christ meeting his mother and then having his clothing removed. The final representations as you climb the steps towards the church are of Christ being nailed to the cross and then his death, which is displayed on the gable of the north porch.

Adjacent the northern corner of the churchyard a well is fed from a spring that rises near the south western corner of the churchyard on Gentle Street . This is used as a site for well dressing each year in May.

The screen and gates at the entrance to the forecourt of the church was built in 1814 by Jeffrey Wyatt at the time when Bath Street was cut as a new road.

== Organ ==
The church has a large three-manual pipe organ. The earliest parts of the organ date from around 1680 and were made by Renatus Harris, but there is later work by Young, Richard Seede and Vowles. In 1923 the organ was rebuilt by Hill, Norman and Beard.

=== List of organists ===
- William Black 1701–1703
- James Clarke 1703–1704
- William Clarke 1704–1710
- Abraham Jordan 1710
- Stephen Jefferies 1710–1717
- Philipp Pembruge 1717–1726
- Matthew Mattock 1727–1736
- John Stevens 1736–1744
- Hugh Wilkins 1744–1783
- Peter Daniell 1783–1799
- Thomas Daniell 1799–1862
- Henry Daniell 1862–1873
- Jabez Pratt 1873–1877
- W.H. Drake 1877–1878
- Mrs. F. Harrold 1878–1915
- George Heath–Gracie 1915–1919
- A.A. Gregory 1919–1920
- H. Alline Fry 1920–1940
- Robert Gillings 1961–1962
- Michael Burton 1962–1965
- David Finnamore 1965–1968
- Peter H. Matthews 1968–1976
- Stephen Carleston 1976–1979
- David Rogers 1980
- Steven Cowley 1981–1982
- Revd Kenneth Denton 1982–1986
- Bryan Hesford 1986
- Colin John Norvall 1987–

== See also ==
- List of ecclesiastical parishes in the Diocese of Bath and Wells
