= Dunmore Castle =

Medieval castle in Galway, Ireland

- Caisleán an Dúin Mhóir (Irish)
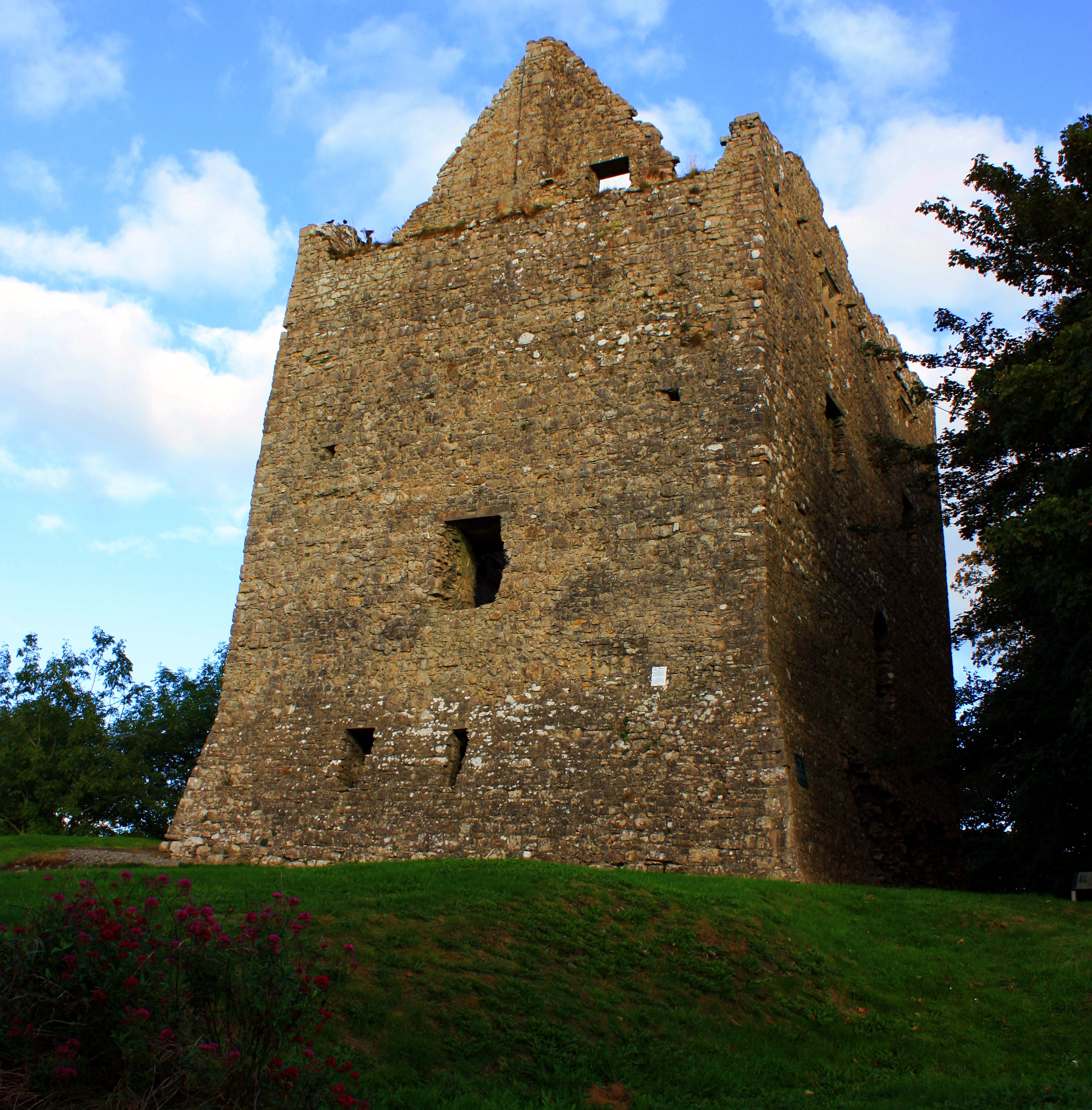

- Location within Ireland
- 53.623756°N 8.755581°W
- Type: keep (donjon)
- Location: Castlefarm, Dunmore, County Galway, Ireland

History
- Built: 14th–16th century

Site notes
- Owner: State

National monument of Ireland
- Official name: Dunmore Castle
- Reference no.: 248

Dunmore Castle is a castle and National Monument located in County Galway, Ireland.

== Location ==
Dunmore Castle is located 1 km (0.62 mi) northwest of Dunmore, County Galway, on the north bank of the Sinking River.

== History ==
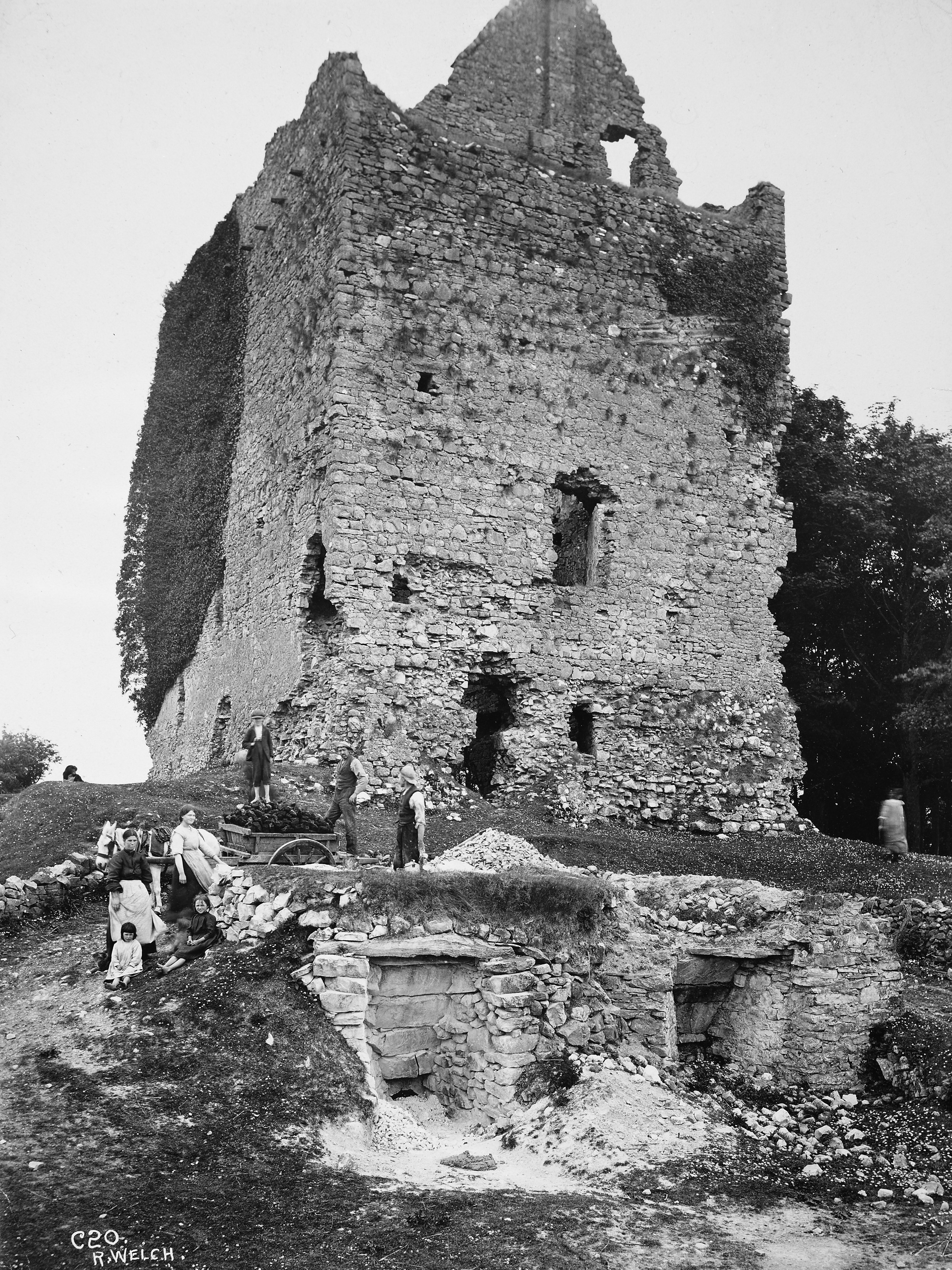
The castle photographed c. 1910, with local people at lower left

Tradition states that Dunmore (Irish dún mór, "great hillfort") was a lesser residence of the ancient Kings of Connacht.

The first castle at Dunmore was built by De Birmingham family in the early 13th century as a bulwark against Gaelic Irish attacks.

In 1249 Dunmore was attacked and burned by the Ó Conchubhair (O'Conors). In 1284 it was besieged by the Síol Maelruain under Fiachra O'Flynn.

In 1315 the castle was damaged by Rory O'Conor during the Bruce campaign in Ireland.

Most of the present structure dates from the early 14th century, i.e. the reigns of Edward II and III as Lords of Ireland: it was a two-storey hall keep. Dunmore Castle was modified in the 16th century, with extra floors, roof gables, chimneys, windows and a ground floor entrance.

The de Berminghams rebelled against Queen Elizabeth I and the castle was taken from them in 1569 by Sir Henry Sidney, Lord Deputy of Ireland, although it was later returned.

The castle was seized from the de Berminghams permanently in the Cromwellian era (1650s). It was occupied by the Ouseley family (including the famous preacher Gideon Ouseley) until the 19th century.

A lime kiln was built on the site in the 19th century. The castle is at present under the protection of the Office of Public Works.

== Description ==
The castle is a rectangular five-storey keep measuring 14 m × 8.2 m (46 ft × 27 ft) at base with a large base-batter.

There is evidence for a garderobe at the northwest. The windows include an oculus, mullions and arrowslits. Some of the curtain wall survives.
