= Harland baronets of Sutton Hall (1808) =

Escutcheon of the Harland baronets of Sutton Hall

The Harland Baronetcy, of Sutton Hall in the County of York, was created in the Baronetage of the United Kingdom on 3 October 1808 for Charles Harland. Born Charles Hoar, he had married Anne Harland, only daughter and heiress of Philip Harland, of Sutton Hall, Yorkshire, in 1802, and had assumed the same year the surname of Harland in lieu of his patronymic. He was childless and the title became extinct on his death in 1810.

== Harland baronets, of Sutton Hall (1808) ==
- Sir Charles Harland, 1st Baronet (died 1810)

== Extended family ==
William Charles Harland, Member of Parliament for Durham, was the nephew of Philip Harland.

== Notes ==
Baronetage of the United Kingdom
Preceded by Pigott baronets	Harland baronets of Sutton Hall; 3 October 1808	Succeeded by Ouseley baronets
