= Ralph Ouseley =

Major General

Ralph Ouseley (1772– 3 May 1842) was a major in the British Army who went on to be a major-general in the Portuguese Army and a knight of the Portuguese Empire.

== Family ==
The sixth surviving son of John Ouseley of Derrymore, County Kerry, he was grand-nephew of antiquarian Ralph Ouseley.

His first marriage was to a Miss Roundtree, with whom he had two sons Thomas John and Gore Whitelock, and a daughter Rebecca Sophia. His second marriage was to Sophia Francesca, the daughter of Alfonso Miguel, with whom he had a further son Gideon Jasper Richard (who was a some-time Protestant and then Roman Catholic clergyman, and vegetarian activist, and who is believed by Richard Alan Young, professor of the New Testament at Temple Baptist Seminary, and others to be the real author of The Gospel of the Holy Twelve).

He died in Lisbon in 1842, and there was a memorial erected to him in Mount Jerome.

== Military career ==
He joined the British Army on 1794-11-25, as a Lieutenant in the Leicester Fencibles. On 1798-08-27 he was at the Battle of Castlebar, commanding a detachment of his regiment under the French adjutant-general Jean Sarrazin, and at the Battle of Ballinamuck for the French surrender to Lord Lake in September 1798.

In 1803, he commanded a company of grenadiers, of the 38th Regiment, during Robert Emmet's insurrection in Dublin, having been appointed to that regiment in March 1801. Afterwards he commanded a detachment of troops defending the powder-mills near Rathcool.

Although he wished to go to India, and (still as a Lieutenant) transferred to the 76th Regiment with that in mind in February 1804, in the following March he was instead sent to the African corps, transferred to the 82nd Regiment in the following August, and then transferred again to the Army depot staff in March 1807.

By September 1809 he was a Major, and transferred to the 63rd Regiment in order to be a part of the army in Portugal, which he did become in November 1809. He continued with the same rank of Major in the Portuguese regiments, joining the 18th Regiment, in which he served during the Peninsular War. He was promoted to Lieutenant-Colonel after the fall of Badajoz in April 1812, and was awarded a medal (for distinguished service against a superior force) after action at Pamplona on 1813-07-30.

Having then transferred to the 8th Regiment in August 1813, he was wounded twice, first by a bayonet to the chest and then by a musket-ball, whilst mounting a night attack at Urdax on 1813-08-31, causing him to be carried off the field of combat. The musket ball was surgically removed through his back.

He having reached the rank of Major in the British Army in 1813, his service was discontinued, with reduced pay, in 1814; so in August 1815 he travelled to Rio de Janeiro, at the time the home of the Royal Court of Portugal. There, the King of Portugal made him a knight of the Portuguese Order of the Tower and Sword.

He was commissioned into the Portuguese Army at the same time, at his older British rank of Lieutenant-Colonel rather than Major. He organized the 1st Regiment of the Portuguese Army, for the purpose of suppressing the Pernambucan revolt, for the success of which the King further made him a Knight Commander of the Royal Military Order of São Bento de Aviz and promoted him to full Colonel. Upon returning from Pernambuco to Rio he was transferred to a staff post, because of his health, and was chosen in 1818 to bear dispatches to England. He had to recover the same after pirates attacked and ransacked the transport.

After he died, a post-mortem examination concluded that a contributory factor towards his death had been the wounds that, three decades earlier, he had sustained at Urdax and the damage to his intestines that he had suffered as the result of the surgery that he had undergone to remove the musket ball.
