= William Gore Ouseley =

British diplomat

Sir William Gore Ouseley
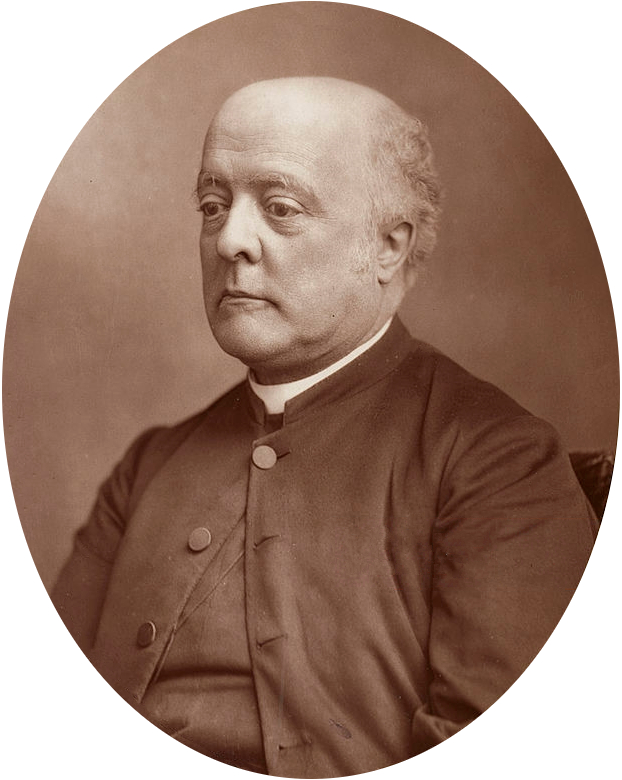
- Born: 26 July 1797
- Died: 6 March 1866 (aged 68)
- Occupation(s): Diplomat, author and artist
- Spouse: Marcia Van Ness
- Children: A daughter and a son who died young
- Parent(s): Sir William Ouseley and Julia née Irving

Sir William Gore Ouseley (26 July 1797 – 6 March 1866) was a British diplomat who served in various roles in Washington, D.C., Rio de Janeiro and Buenos Aires. His main achievement were negotiations concerning ownership of Britain's interests in what is now Honduras and Nicaragua.

== Career ==
Ouseley was born in London to the orientalist Sir William Ouseley and his wife, Julia. He was attaché in Washington, D.C., from 1825 to 1832, when he had his first book published. The country of Argentina was effectively created in 1816, and he was amongst a group of Britons who assisted the new country gaining an advantage for Britain, negotiating contracts for expertise such as railways.

Ouseley later served in Rio de Janeiro in 1832 as a consul where he rose to the rank of minister. Not soon after that he was posted to Buenos Aires where he remained until 1850. His book concerning the slave trade which he published in 1850 is still (2007) in print.

Ouseley was very well connected, having a Governor as a father-in-law, a sister-in-law who was also a judge in New York and another sister who had received a marriage proposal from US President James Buchanan. He had but one blot on his record, having been recalled from Rio de Janeiro, although his superior was generous enough to admit that the argument that caused the recall was in hindsight found to be in Ouseley's favour. In the UK, both his father and his uncle, Sir Gore Ouseley, were well-connected diplomats and gentleman scholars.

=== Special mission ===
In October 1858, he was sent on a special mission to San José in Costa Rica as a Special Envoy on the British warship Valorous; William Synge served as secretary to the mission. Ouseley's objective was to resolve Britain's interests in Central America, particularly the Bay Islands off Honduras, the Mosquito Coast and Greytown (both now in Nicaragua). His diplomatic activity in Costa Rica was favored by the fact that he was a relative of Sophia Joy, the British second wife of President José María Montealegre (1859–1863).

In 1859, he negotiated a treaty concerning the British interests with Nicaragua and with Costa Rica which involved the President of Nicaragua personally. In early November, Ouseley required a change for his health and he announced his return to Britain before the treaty was signed.

Within two weeks he had to return as his only son, William Charles Ouseley, had died at the age of 27 in Asunción, Paraguay due to an opium overdose.

== Art and literature ==
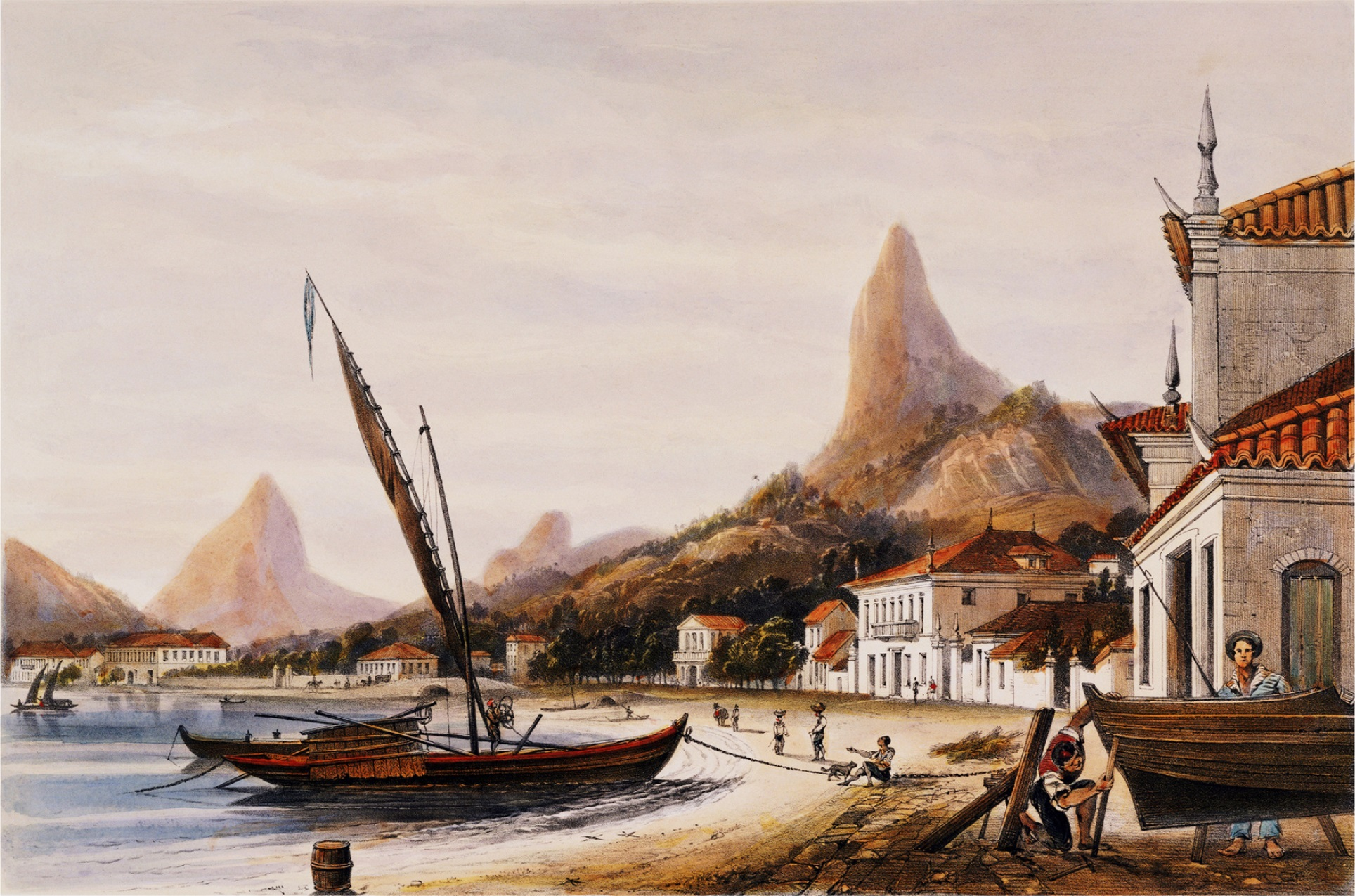
Botafogo Bay near Rio de Janeiro by William Gore Ouseley – 1852

Ouseley was also an early commentator on the legends which grew up around the historical figure Dick Whittington.

Ouseley's Travels (1819) was among the first to publish that a cognate cat tale was to be found in the Persian manuscript of the Tarik al-Wasaf. The story is related thus:

In the tenth century, one Keis, the son of a poor widow in Síraf, embarked for India, with his sole property, a cat, his only property. There he fortunately arrived at a time when the palace was so infested by mice or rats, that they invaded the king's food, and persons were employed to drive them from the royal banquet. Keis produced his cat; the noxious animals soon disappeared, and magnificent rewards were bestowed on the adventurer of Síraf, who returned to that city, and afterwards, with his mother and brothers, settled on the island, which from him has been denominated Keis, or according to the Persians, Keish.

A little earlier, James Morier Second Journey (1818) also published the connection between Whittington's cat and the same tale, having heard the story told by the ambassador (i.e. Ouseley's uncle, Sir Gore).

== Abolitionist ==
In 1850 Ouseley published "Notes on the Slave Trade". At that time there was a proposal to withdraw the British naval squadrons that patrolled the Atlantic to put down the slave trade on the grounds that they were ineffective and cost too much money. In his book Ouseley argued that they did much good and should be kept. Appealing to his own experience as a diplomat in Brazil, he recalled that by "the active exertions of our cruisers and the intelligent and zealous co-operation of our officers" the slave trade from Africa to Brazil was greatly reduced.

Nearly a score of slave-vessels lay idle in the harbour of Rio de Janeiro, the owners, masters, and crews, finding the risks too great and of too disagreeable a nature, would not venture out.

Ouseley argued against slavery on moral and religious grounds, and said it was exacerbated by racial prejudice. "Slavery and the prejudice of colour re-act on each other mutually as cause and effect".

== Personal life ==
Whilst he was in America, he married Marcia Van Ness (d. 1881) in 1827, the 20-year-old daughter of the Governor of Vermont, Cornelius P. Van Ness (1782–1852).

- William Charles Ouseley (d. 1859), died aged 27 in Asunción, Paraguay, due to an opium overdose.

He died 6 March 1866, and his wife died in 1881.

== Major works ==
- Remarks on the statistics and political institutions of the United States‚ with some observations on the ecclesiastical system of America‚ her sources of revenue, 1832
- Notes on the Slave Trade‚ with Remarks on the Measures Adopted for its Suppression, 1850
- A description of views in South America‚ from original drawings made in Brazil‚ the River Plate‚ the Parana, 1852
- Views in South America, from original drawings made in Brazil, the River Plate, the Paraná, etc. (London: Thomas McLean, 1852). Geyer Collection, Rio de Janeiro, Brazil
