= Frederick Ouseley =

English composer and musicologist (1825-1889)

The Reverend Sir Frederick Ouseley Bt
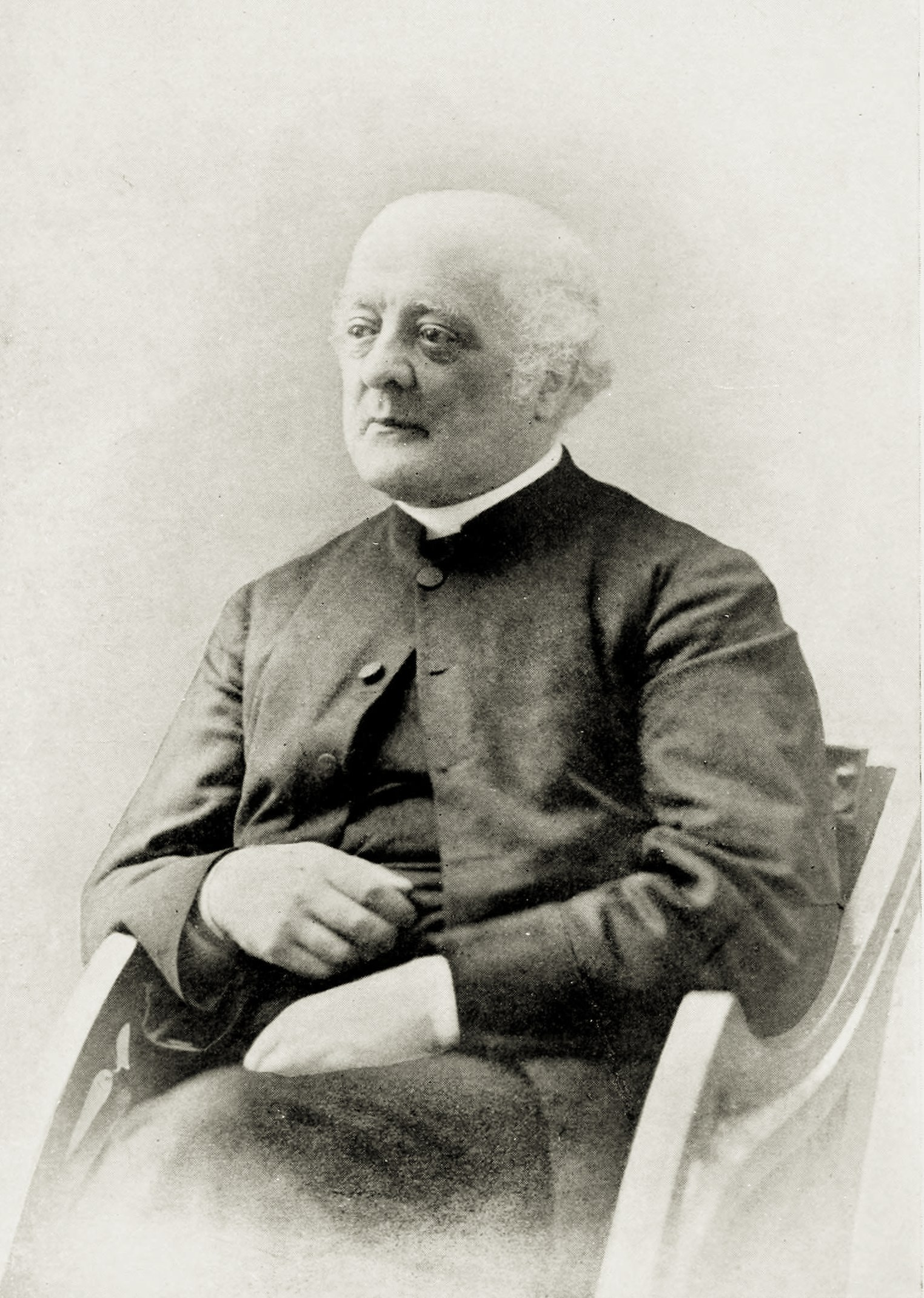
- Born: 12 August 1825; London, England
- Died: 6 April 1889 (aged 63)
- Era: Romantic
- Works: List of Works

Sir Frederick Arthur Gore Ouseley, 2nd Baronet (12 August 1825 – 6 April 1889), was an English composer, organist, musicologist and priest.

== Biography ==
Frederick Ouseley was born in London, the son of Sir Gore Ouseley, and manifested an extraordinary precocity in music, composing his first piece at the age of three, and writing hundreds more in the following years. He composed two youthful operas, the first of which (Tom and His Mama) was written at the age of seven. His next opera (L'Isola disabitata) was written at the age of eight years and is frequently cited as the most advanced of his juvenilia. In 1844 he succeeded to the baronetcy. He matriculated at Christ Church, Oxford in 1843, where he graduated BA in 1846 and MA in 1849. He was ordained in the latter year, and, as curate of St Paul's Church, Knightsbridge, served the parish of St Barnabas, Pimlico until 1851. He studied composition and the theory of music under Dr. Stephen Elvey at Oxford.

Throughout his life, Ouseley experienced a social conflict between his aristocratic heritage and his interest in the performance of Anglican church music, an activity which was seen as beneath someone of his stature. In 1850 he took the degree of Mus.B. at the University of Oxford, and four years afterwards that of Mus.D., his exercise being the oratorio The Martyrdom of St Polycarp. He was Heather Professor of Music at Oxford from 1855 to 1889. In 1856, Ouseley both founded and endowed with his own funds St Michael's College on the outskirts of Tenbury Wells, a choir school intended to serve as a model for Anglican church music. Ouseley was clear that the standard of music in the English church was lacking and through his foundation at Tenbury, he would help to change that. As well as being the college founder, he became the school's first warden.

== Death ==
Ouseley died in Hereford, where he had been precentor at Hereford Cathedral since 1855.

== Works ==
Ouseley's works included a second oratorio, Hagar (Hereford, 1873), a great number of services and anthems, psalm chants, cantatas, chamber music, organ pieces and songs. Among his instructional treaties on harmony, counterpoint, fugue, and composition are Harmony (1868) and Counterpoint (1869) and Musical Form (1875). He also added a series of chapters on English music to the English translation of Emil Naumann's History of Music, the subject having been practically ignored in the German treatise.

=== Choral ===
[unfinished]

- Anthems:
  - All the kings of the earth
  - And there was a pure river of Water of life
  - And there was a war in heaven
  - Ascribe ye greatness
  - Awake, thou that sleepest
  - Behold, how good and joyful
  - Behold now, praise the Lord
  - Be merciful unto me
  - Blessed be the Lord God of Israel
  - Blessed be Thou
  - Blessed is he whose unrighteousness
  - Blessed is the man
  - Christ is risen from the dead
  - Except the Lord build the house
  - From the rising of the sun
  - Give thanks, O Israel
  - Great is the Lord
  - Happy is the man
  - Haste Thee, O God
  - How goodly are the tents
  - Is it nothing to you
  - It came even to pass
  - Jerusalem on high
  - O Saviour of the world
- Oratorios
  - St Polycarp (1854)
  - Hagar (Hereford Festival, 1873)
- Services
  - Evening Service in B flat
  - Evening Service in E flat
- Miscellaneous
  - Gloria in D
  - Te Deum in D
  - Te Deum in F
- Hymn tunes
  - Contemplation (When all thy mercies, O my God)
  - Hereford (When wounded sore the stricken heart)
  - Bewdley (Children of the heavenly King)
  - St Gabriel.

Baronetage of the United Kingdom
Preceded by Gore Ouseley	Baronet (of Claremont); 1844–1889	Extinct
