= William Synge =

English diplomat and author (1826–1891)

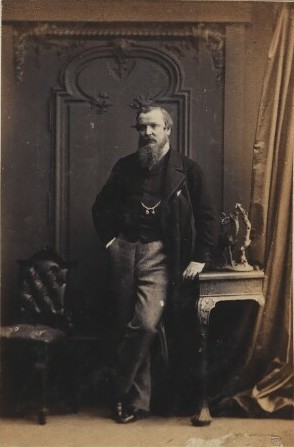
William Webb Follett Synge, photograph by Camille Silvy, 1862

William Webb Follett Synge (25 August 1826 – 29 May 1891) was a British diplomat and author, known for his contributions to The Standard, Punch and the Saturday Review.

== Biography ==
William Synge was born in 1826 to the Rev. Robert Synge, M.A. (d. 1862), by his first wife, Anne (d. 1844), daughter of William Webb Follett. After being educated almost entirely abroad, he joined the Foreign Office on 26 June 1846.

He served in the British legation at Washington from 15 September 1851 to 1 July 1853, during the presidency of Millard Fillmore. Whilst there he married, on 27 January 1853, Henrietta Mary, youngest daughter of Robert Dewar Wainwright, colonel in the United States army.

Returning to the UK, he began his literary career in his leisure time, writing in a journal called The Press. His contributions to Punch began during the Crimean War (1853–56), and include a well-received poem, Sursum Corda (Lift up your Hearts - Punch, November 1854) which reflected on the bloody Battle of the Alma (20 September 1854).

On 26 July 1856 he was appointed secretary to Sir William Gore Ouseley’s special mission to Central America, which sought to resolve Britain's interests in Central America, particularly the Bay Islands off Honduras, the Mosquito Coast and Greytown, and during his absence on that mission obtained the rank of assistant clerk at the Foreign Office on 7 December 1857. While with Ouseley, in 1859, he met Anthony Trollope, who describes Synge as 'a very prince of good fellows ... as pleasant a companion as a man would wish to meet', albeit perhaps disapproving of Synge's Tory politics.

Synge returned to work in London on 28 February 1860. He was appointed commissioner and consul-general for the Sandwich Islands (nowadays the Hawaiian Islands) on 27 December 1861, and in that capacity stood proxy for the Prince of Wales at the christening of Albert Kamehameha, the prince of Hawaii. In 1865 he escorted Queen Emma of Hawaii to England. On 30 October 1865 he became consul-general and commissary judge in Cuba; but here his health, already impaired, gave way, and he retired from the foreign service on 31 October 1868.

Settling first at Guildford, and then in 1883 at Eastbourne, Synge gave himself up to literature. He wrote regularly for The Standard. In 1875 he published his first novel, Olivia Raleigh, which was well-received in a Spectator review; in 1883 he began to contribute to the Saturday Review.

Synge was a friend of William Makepeace Thackeray, and shared with him an interest in nonsense verse, which later gave rise to Synge's Bumblebee Bogo’s Budget, a book of rhymes for children. Synge was also acquainted with many of the writers of his time, both in England and America.

Besides his contributions both in prose and verse to periodicals, the more notable of which are Sursum Corda and A Patriot Queen (Blackwood's Magazine, February 1878), he published two novels and a book of children's verse.

William and Henrietta had four sons and a daughter, one of whom, Robert, went on to serve in the Foreign Office, rising to Assistant Master of the Ceremonies before his untimely death.

- Robert Follett Synge - b. 8 December 1853
- Francis Julian Synge - b. 2 July 1856
- Gilbert Hugo Follett Synge - d. 18 March 1868
- William Makepeace Thackeray Synge - b. 5 August 1860
- Maria Montresor Auchmuty Synge

William Synge died at Eastbourne on 29 May 1891.

== Publications ==
- Olivia Raleigh, London, 1875.
- Tom Singleton, Dragoon and Dramatist, 3 vols. London, 1879. - Vol. I, Vol. II, Vol III
- Bumblebee Bogo’s Budget, 1888.
