= William Franklin (physician) =

English surgeon

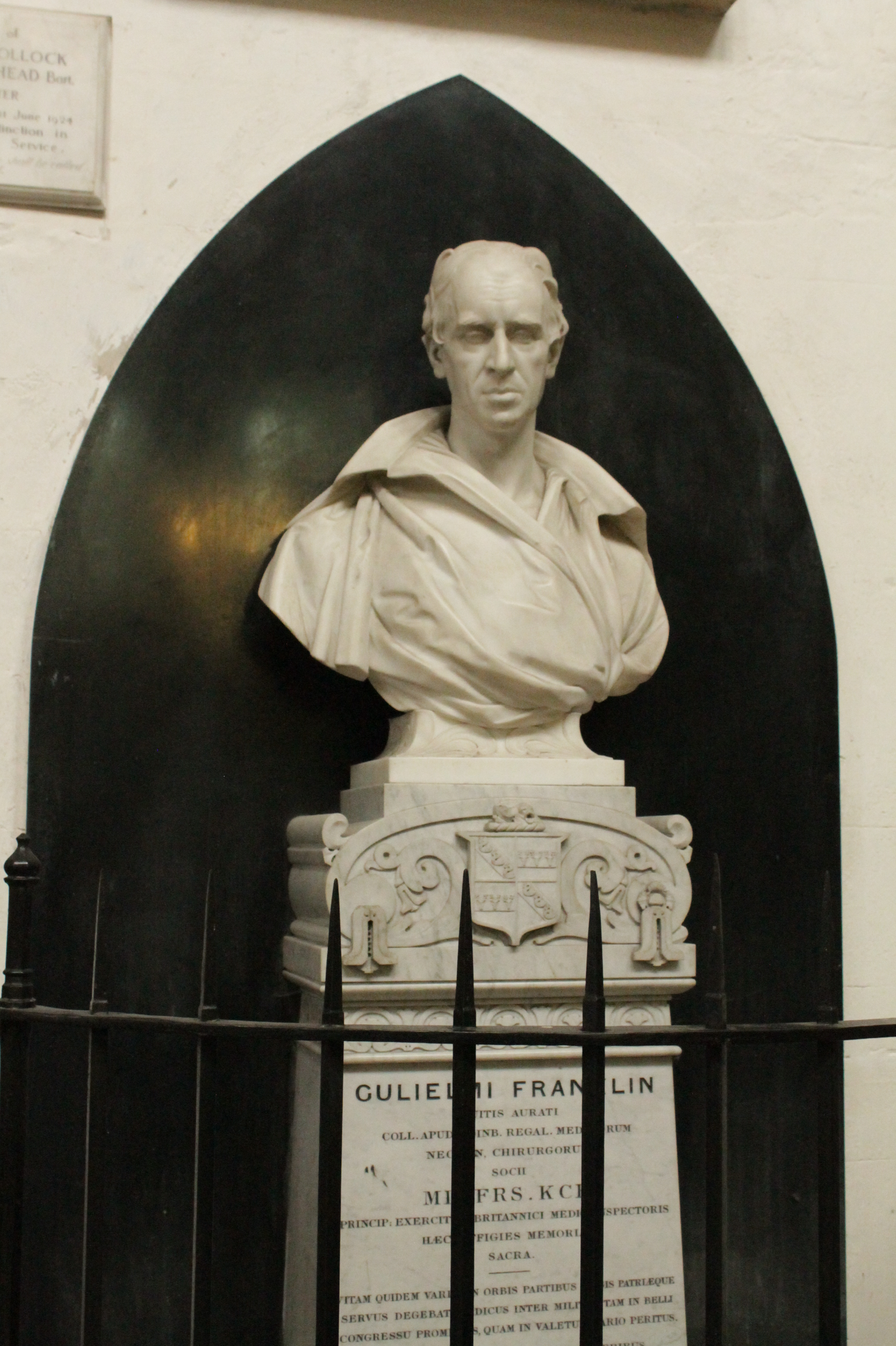
Tomb of Dr William Franklin FRS in Rochester Cathedral

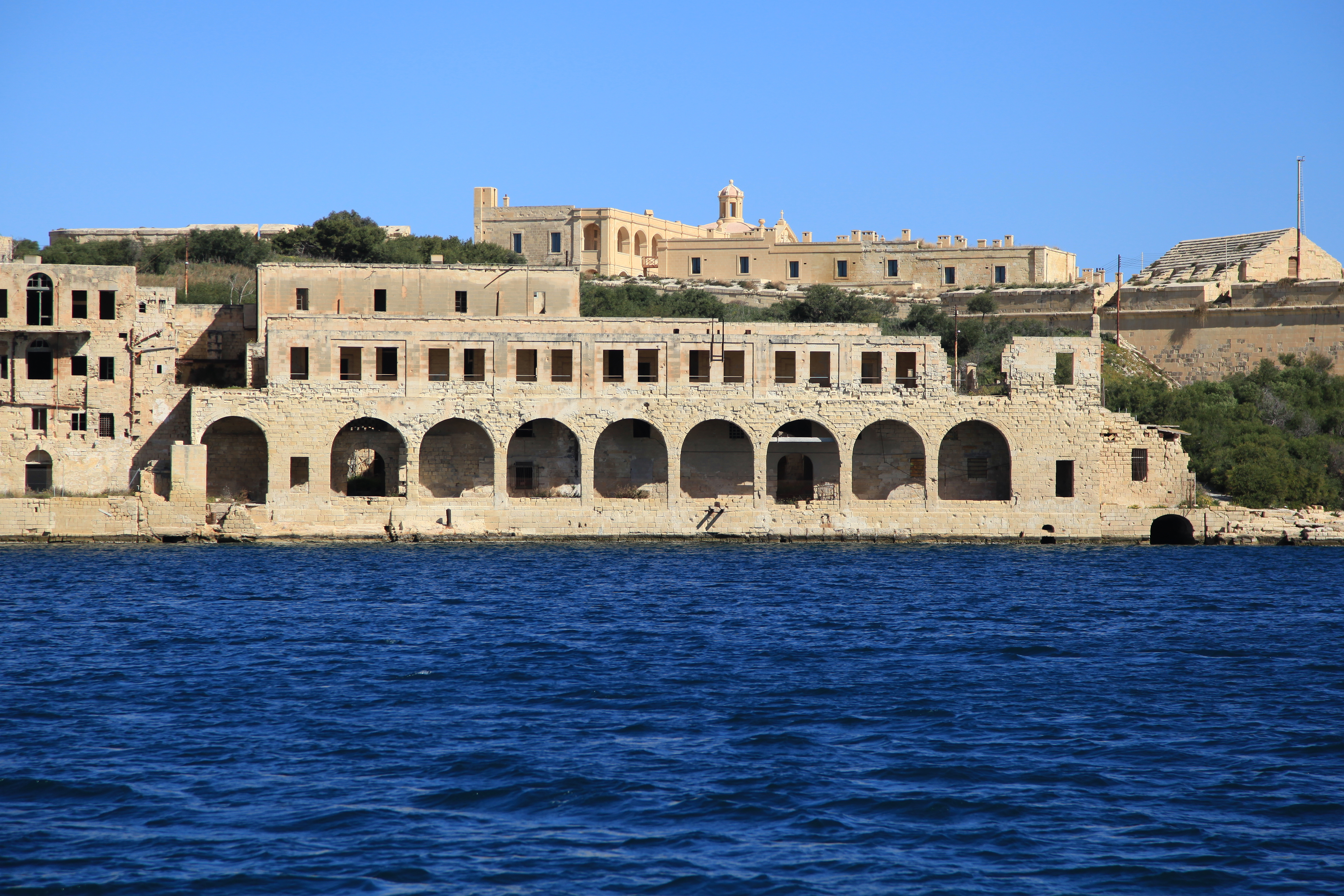
Lazzaretto Hospital on Manoel Island, Malta

Sir William Franklin (1763–1833) was an English surgeon and Fellow of the Royal Society.

He was born in the Holborn district of London in 1763. He studied Medicine and Materia Medica at Aberdeen University. He first worked as assistant apothecary to Robert McLellan in the Foundling Hospital in London. He obtained a post as Surgeon's Assistant in the British Army in October 1787 initially serving the 43rd Regiment of Foot. He became a surgeon in the 15th Regiment of Foot in May 1790. In 1795 he travelled with the Regiment to the West Indies where he served both as Surgeon and Apothecary to the Garrison.

Aberdeen University awarded him his doctorate (MD) in 1795. In September 1796 to become Assistant Inspector of Hospitals (this included foreign military hospitals). In September 1799 he was part of the Helder Expedition which was the British invasion of Holland, in which he took active part in battles. In April 1800 he became Assistant Inspector General, being posted first to Egypt then to Malta in December 1801 where he became Head of Medical Services for Malta. This included running the Lazaretto Hospital as Superintendent of Quarantine and overseeing medical services on Sicily. He was raised to Inspector of Hospitals in April 1802.

In 1804 he was elected a Fellow of the Royal College of Physicians of Edinburgh. He was created Principal Inspector General of Hospitals on 12 July 1810, the highest position in British Medicine, this partially being precipitated by the removal of the previous senior officers due to failures in the Walcheren Expedition. He was elected a Fellow of the Royal Society in May 1820.

He retired in July 1833 and died on 29 October 1833 at the home of his son-in-law Rev Bennett in London and is buried in Rochester Cathedral. The monument at his grave was sculpted by Samuel Joseph in 1837.

== Family ==
On 25 May 1815 he married Joanna (aka Gianina) Modesta Paula Trigance of Porto Salvo, Valletta, Malta (1776 - 1830) at St Pancras Chapel in Camden Town in London. Their eight children included: Mary Concetta Franklin, Jane Concetta Franklin, Eliza Concetta Franklin, William Richard Franklin, Henry "Francis" Franklin, Robert Moss Franklin, Frances Concetta Franklin and Major General Charles Trigance Franklin CB (1823-1895).

His daughter Mary Concetta Franklin married William James Early Bennett.
