= Joseph Walker Jasper Ouseley =

British orientalist (1800–1889)

- Born: 21 June 1800
- Died: 29 October 1889 (aged 89)
- Occupation: Orientalist
- Parent(s): Ralph Ouseley and Mary Collins

Joseph Walker Jasper Ouseley (21 June 1800–29 October 1889) was a British orientalist and a colonel in the British Army.

The son of Ralph Ouseley by his second wife Mary Collins, Joseph was educated in Limerick. He joined the British Army as an ensign in 1819, in which he reached the rank of colonel by the time that he retired. He never saw combat. After being posted to the Bengal European Regiment in India, he became a military attaché in oriental languages, having tutored himself during the sea voyage from home in 1820 and then having attended the College of Fort William in Calcutta, from which he graduated with honours in Arabic and Persian in 1822. By that time he had attained the rank of Lieutenant.

He became a professor of Arabic, Bengali, Marathi, and Persian at the College of Fort William in 1825, and was Superintendent of the Mysore Princes from 1838 to 1844. Returning home to Britain in 1844, he became an examiner at Haileybury College until 1859, and then from 1862 to 1883 was a civil service examiner in Arabic and Persian languages.

The Joseph Walker Jasper Ouseley scholarships to the School of Oriental and African Studies at the University of London, intended to fund the studies of Arabic, Persian, Hindustani, and other languages, were endowed in his name by his daughters Mary and Louisa Ouseley.
