= W. J. E. Bennett =

English Anglican priest (1804–1886)

- Vicar
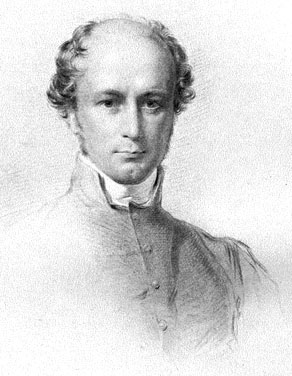
- Church: Church of England
- In office: 1852–1886

Orders
- Ordination: 6 June 1830 by Bishop of London

Personal details
- Born: William James Early Bennett; 15 November 1804 Halifax, Nova Scotia
- Died: 1886 (aged 81–82)
- Denomination: Anglican
- Spouse: Mary Concetta Franklin
- Education: Christ Church, Oxford

William James Early Bennett (1804–1886) was an Anglican priest. Bennett is celebrated for having provoked the decision that the doctrine of the Real Presence is a dogma not inconsistent with the creed of the Church of England. This followed the publication of his pamphlet A Plea for Toleration in the Church of England (1867) in the form of a letter to Edward Bouverie Pusey.

== Life ==
Bennett was born at Halifax, Nova Scotia, on 15 November 1804, the eldest son of Major William Bennett, RE, and Mary Early, daughter of James Early, an officer of the 1st Royal Garrison Battalion. He was educated at Westminster School and Christ Church, Oxford (BA, 1827, MA, 1829).

Having married in 1828, Bennett was ordained a priest by the Bishop of London on 6 June 1830. He initially served in 1830 as curate of Oxford Chapel (later called St. Peter's, Vere Street, London), but he soon moved to curacies at Holy Trinity Church Marylebone (1830–1833), followed by All Souls Church, Langham Place (1833–1838). For a while he held this latter post alongside the Perpetual curacy of Portman Chapel, Portman Square 1836–1841). His post was subsequently redesignated as Perpetual curate of St Paul's Church, Knightsbridge and St Barnabas, Pimlico. He supervised the completion of the former church and was effectively the founder of the latter. At the same time he conceived the idea of establishing a college there to accommodate the priests and its choristers. In 1851 he felt obliged to resign these posts following doctrinal complaints and a theological dispute with his bishop, Charles James Blomfield—after being accused of ritualism. Finally in 1852 he was appointed as Vicar of the Church of St John the Baptist, Frome or Frome-Selwood in Somerset, where he remained until his death on 17 August 1886.

== Family ==
On 21 August 1828 Bennett married Mary Concetta Franklin, daughter of William Franklin FRS and his wife Joanna (Gianina) Modesta Paula Trigance. His wife died in 1879. William lived his final years in the Bennett home until his death in 1886.

His younger brother, George Augustus Bennett (1807–1845), like their father, served in the Corps of Royal Engineers. His youngest brother, Frederick Hamilton Bennett (1816–1873), ordained to the curacy of Daventry (1840), Curate-in-charge of St John's, Worcester (1842–1851), Master of Arts, Christ Church, Oxford (1843), served his final appointment as the first vicar of Saint Mary the Virgin, Freeland, Oxfordshire, from 1869.

An account of Bennett's life and of his contribution to the Oxford Movement was provided by his nephew Frederick Bennett, Frederick Hamilton Bennett's son, formerly Rector of Farleigh, Surrey.

== Arms of Bennett ==
Crest—Out of a mural crown or, a lion's head gules. Motto—De bon vouloir servir le roy (To serve the king with good will).

== Publications ==
- Bennett, William James Early (1837). The Eucharist, Its History, Doctrine, and Practice, with Meditations and Prayers Suitable to that Holy Sacrament. London: W. J. Cleaver.
- Bennett, William James Early (1842). Lecture-sermons on the Distinctive Errors of Romanism. Preached in Portman Chapel, St. Marylebone, Lent 1842 (3rd ed.). London: W. J. Cleaver.
- Bennett, William James Early, ed. (1847). Lives of Certain Fathers of the Church in the Fourth Century: for the Instruction of the Young. Vol. 1. London: W. J. Cleaver.
- Bennett, William James Early, ed. (1850). Lives of Certain Fathers of the Church in the Fourth Century: for the Instruction of the Young. Vol. 2. London: W. J. Cleaver.
- Bennett, William James Early, ed. (1851). Lives of Certain Fathers of the Church in the Fourth Century: for the Instruction of the Young. Vol. 3. London: Joseph Masters.
- Bennett, William James Early (1848). The Principles of the Book of Common Prayer Considered. A Series of Lecture Sermons (New ed.). London: W. J. Cleaver.
- Bennett, William James Early; Blomfield, Charles James (1850). Correspondence Between the Rev. W. J. E. Bennett, of St Paul's, Knightsbridge, with the Bishop of London, Relative to the Resignation of Mr. Bennett. London: Charles Westerton.
- Bennett, William James Early (1851). The Last Sermons, Preached at Saint Paul's, Knightsbridge, and Saint Barnabas', Pimlico. London: W. J. Cleaver.
- Bennett, William James Early (1868). A Plea for Toleration in the Church of England, in a Letter to the Rev. E. B. Pusey, D.D. (3 ed.). London; Froome-Selwood: J. T. Hayes; W. C. & J. Penny.
- Bennett, William James Early (1878). A Defence of the Catholic Faith: Being a Reply to the Late Charge of the Bishop of Bath and Wells. London: J. T. Hayes.

Bennett was a prolific writer, and his numerous works were listed in successive editions of Crockford's Clerical Directory. His publication The Old Church Porch (1854–1862), issued at Frome, is sometimes cited as being in effect the first parish magazine, although this claim has been disputed.
