= Samuel Joseph (sculptor) =

British sculptor (1791–1850)

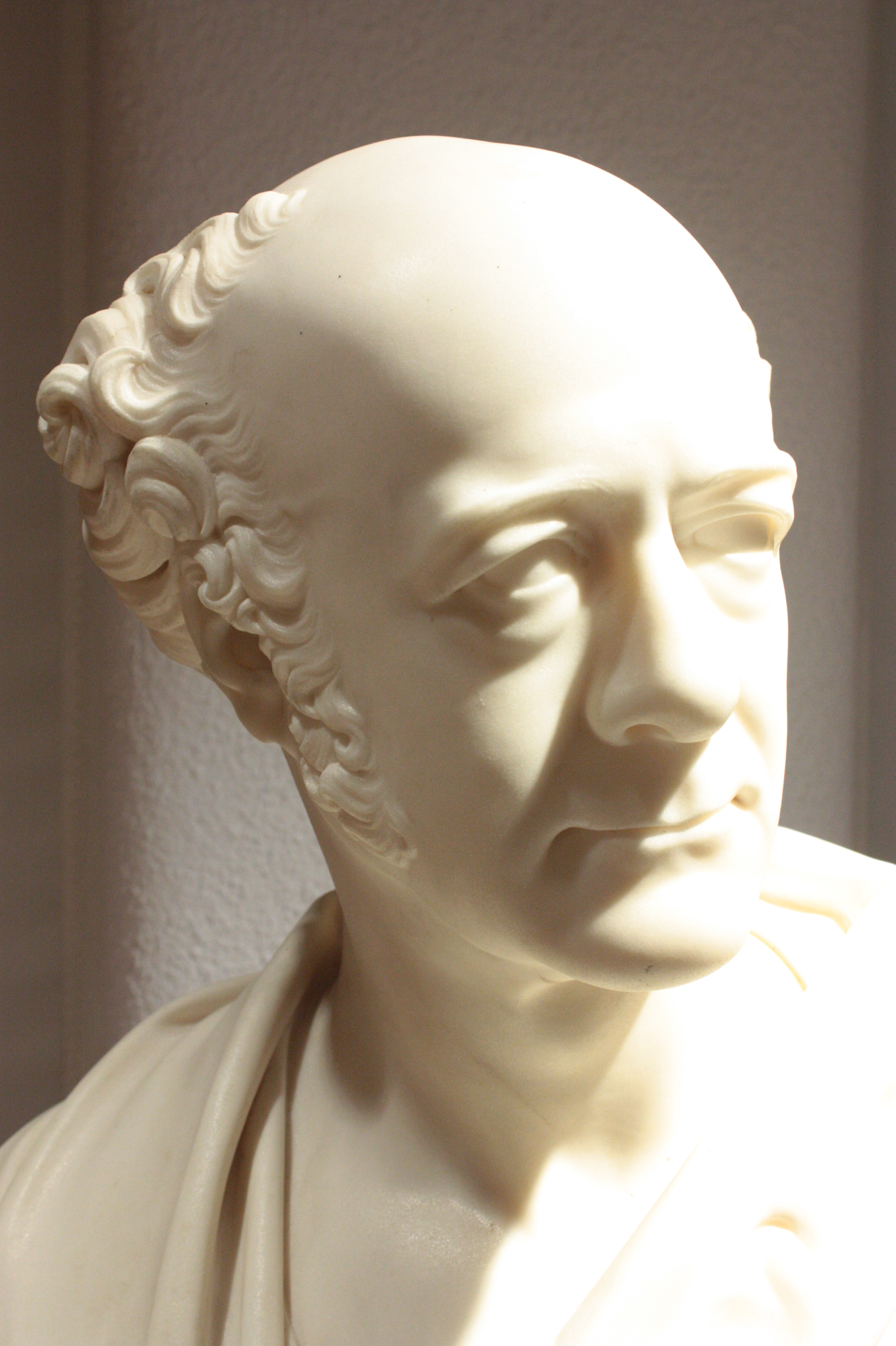
William Trotter of Ballandean by Samuel Joseph

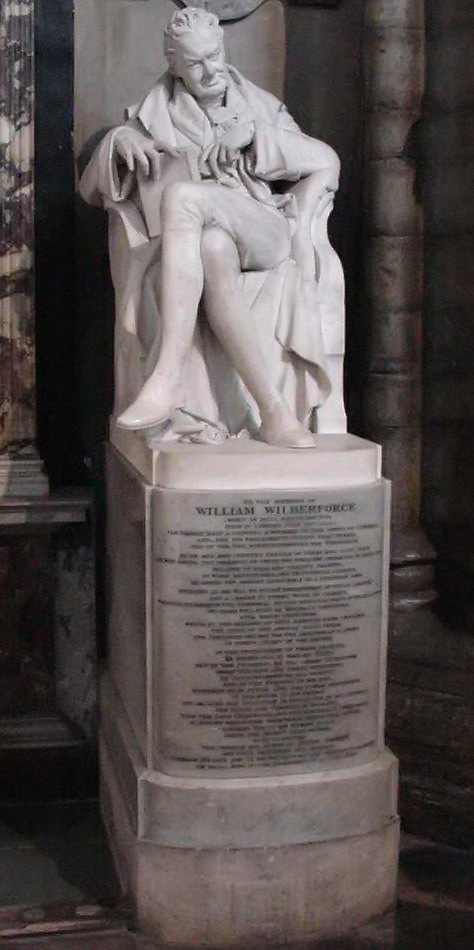
Statue of William Wilberforce by Samuel Joseph, in Westminster Abbey.

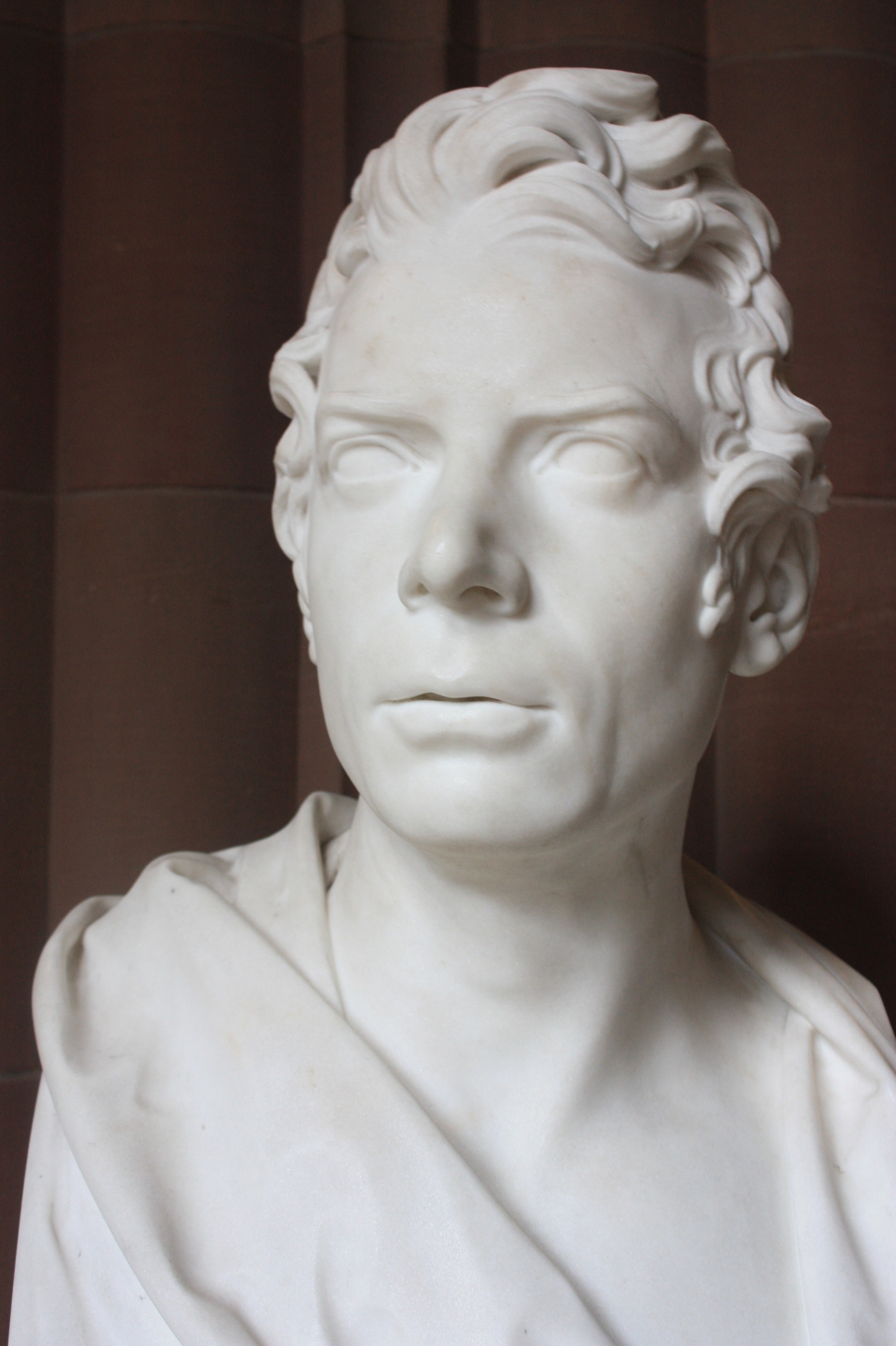
Sir David Wilkie by Samuel Joseph, 1842.

Samuel Joseph RSA (1791 – 1 July 1850) was a British sculptor, working in the early 19th century.

== Life ==
Very little is known about Joseph's early life.

He was a pupil of Peter Rouw, and attended the Royal Academy Schools in 1811, gaining the silver medal there in both 1811 and 1812. In 1815 he won the gold medal for "Eve Supplicating Forgiveness". In 1823 he went to Edinburgh, becoming a founding member of the Royal Scottish Academy in 1826. During this time he taught Alexander Handyside Ritchie.

He left Edinburgh in 1829 to set up a bigger and more prestigious studio in London.

His most famous and noted work is the statue of William Wilberforce in Westminster Abbey, created in 1838. A plaster copy of it also exists in St John's College, Cambridge. He exhibited in the Royal Academy from 1811 to 1846, and the Royal Scottish Academy from 1827 to 1835. He was declared bankrupt in 1848 and forced to sell most of his belongings.

He died in London on 1 July 1850, leaving seven children. The Royal Academy granted a pension to his widow, which continued until her death, 13 years later. A wax portrait of Samuel Joseph by T. Smith was exhibited in 1828 at the Royal Academy.

He is known to have trained the Edinburgh sculptor Peter Slater.

== Principal works ==
- Monument to William Vassall, Battersea Parish Church, 1800
- Bust of his tutor's son, Master T. Rouw, exhibited in Royal Academy, 1811
- Monument to Rev John Tattershall, Otterden, Kent, 1812
- Bust of Edmund Kean for Drury Lane, 1815
- Bust of Lord Beresford, exhibited in Royal Academy, 1819
- Bust of General Sir Lowry Cole, exhibited in Royal Academy, 1819
- Monument to Rev Granville Wheler, Otterden, Kent, 1820
- Bust of Michael Angelo Taylor, exhibited in Royal Scottish Academy, 1821
- Bust of Henry Mackenzie, Scottish National Portrait Gallery, 1822
- Bust of Charles Matthews, National Portrait Gallery, 1822
- Bust of Mr Liston, exhibited at Royal Academy, 1824
- Bust of Lord John Campbell, 1st Baron Campbell, exhibited at Royal Academy, 1824
- Bust of Sir Walter Scott, Preston Hall near Edinburgh, 1825
- Bust of Sir Henry Wellwood, National Gallery, 1825
- Bust of Robert Stevenson (civil engineer), for Bell Rock Lighthouse, 1828
- Bust of the Duke of Argyll, exhibited in Royal Academy, 1830
- Bust of Sir Herbert Taylor, exhibited in Royal Academy, 1830
- Small bronze of John Flaxman, York Art Gallery, 1830
- Bust of King George IV, exhibited in Suffolk Street Galleries, 1831.
- Bust of Davies Gilbert, exhibited in Royal Academy, 1831
- Bust of Rev Jonathan Brooks, exhibited in Liverpool Academy, 1832
- Monument to Rev Latham Wainwright, Great Brickhill, Bucks, 1833
- Bust of Lord Brougham, exhibited in Royal Academy, 1833
- Bust of William Wilberforce, School for the Blind, York, 1833
- Monument to Agnes Wilberforce, East Farleigh, Kent, 1834
- Bust of King William IV, Penshurst Place, Kent, 1834
- Bust of King William IV, United Service Club, London, 1834
- Bust of Sir William Franklin, Rochester Cathedral, 1837
- Bust of Lady De L'Isle and Dudley, Penshurst Place, Kent, 1838
- Statue of William Wilberforce in Westminster Abbey, 1838
- Bust of Colonel Gurwood, Apsley House, 1840
- Bust of Rev Archibald Alison, Scottish National Portrait Gallery, 1841
- Bust of Sir David Wilkie, National Gallery of Scotland, 1842
- Statue of Sir David Wilkie in Tate Gallery, 1843
- Bust of the Earl of Shannon, exhibited in Royal Academy, 1844
- Statue of Hon Elizabeth Eliot, Port Eliot, Cornwall exhibited in Royal Academy, 1838
- Statue of Sir Hugh Myddelton, Royal Exchange, London, 1845
- Bronze bust of Prof Dugald Stewart, Scottish National Portrait Gallery, date unknown
- Bust of William Huskisson, Petworth House, date unknown
- Bust of Voltaire, Elvetham Hall, Hants, date unknown
- Bust of James Gregory (physician), Old College, University of Edinburgh, date unknown
