= The Gospel of the Holy Twelve =

Christian text focusing on vegetarianism

The Gospel of the Holy Twelve, first serialised in The Lindsey and Lincolnshire Star newspaper between July 30, 1898 and March 10, 1901, presents vegetarian versions of traditional teachings and events described in the canonical New Testament.

The first collected edition of essays (or 'Lections') by the author, a former clergyman, Rev. Gideon Jasper Richard Ouseley (1834–1906, son of Ralph Ouseley) was published in 1901. By the time of Ouseley's death the title was out of print but the executor of his manuscript, Samuel Hopgood Hart (1865–1958) re-issued the text in 1924. There have been numerous editions published since the 1950s and the title remains in print and on the Internet.

== Controversy ==
The Gospel of the Holy Twelve presents vegetarian versions of traditional teachings and events described in the canonical New Testament. The first collected volume was issued by The Order of At-One-Ment and United Templars Society—a publishing imprint which the author had established in 1881. The explanatory preface referred to an ancient source manuscript "preserved in the Monasteries of Thibet" which has never been produced or proven to exist. In subsequent editions, released during the early 1900s, the anonymous Editors revised their claim by stating that the text was "communicated" by departed mystics "in dreams and visions of the night".

The work remains unrecognised by academic Biblical scholars and has been dismissed by modern theologians and historians of the animal rights movement. In response to a campaign by People for the Ethical Treatment of Animals which claimed "Jesus was a Vegetarian", the Reverend Professor Andrew Linzey referred to The Gospel of the Holy Twelve and similar publications, stating, "try as I may, I can find no evidence for their antiquity and I deeply fear that they are works of fiction." Richard Alan Young, a Professor of New Testament Studies has similarly stated, "It appears that Ouseley created The Gospel of the Holy Twelve in support of animal welfare and vegetarianism."

The thematic tendency of Rev Ouseley to revise and rewrite traditional Biblical passages along vegetarian lines in the course of his publishing activity is examined by John M. Gilheany, who notes that the authenticity of the Gospel of the Holy Twelve was severely challenged by animal rights pioneer Henry Stephens Salt (1851–1939) in a memoir as well as in the vegetarian press.

== See also ==
- Edmond Bordeaux Szekely, author of a similar modern forgeries in favor of vegetarianism
- List of Gospels
