= Dunmore, County Galway =

Dunmore Dún Mór
- Town
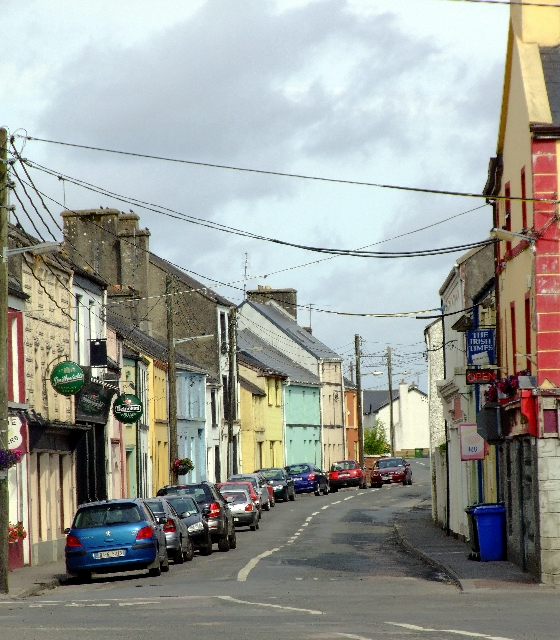
- Castle Street

- Location in Ireland
- Coordinates: 53°37′00″N 8°44′00″W
- Country: Ireland
- Province: Connacht
- County: County Galway
- Elevation: 75 m (246 ft)

Population (2022)
  - Total: 664
- Time zone: UTC+0 (WET)
  - Summer (DST): UTC-1 (IST (WEST))
- Irish Grid Reference: M515632

Dunmore (Irish: Dún Mór, meaning 'big fort') is a town in County Galway, Ireland. It is located on the N83 national secondary road at its junction with the R328 and R360 regional roads. The town is in a townland and civil parish of the same name.

The town belongs to an ancient tuath called Conmaicne Dúna Móir, ruled by Uí Conchobair of Ui Briuin Ai from the 12th century, and a capital of Connacht for a time. King Tairrdelbach Ua Conchobair died here in 1156.

Until the early 1980s, the N83 through Dunmore was on the main road from Sligo to Galway. Improvements to the N17 route through Knock and Claremorris reduced the amount of traffic on the N83.

== History ==
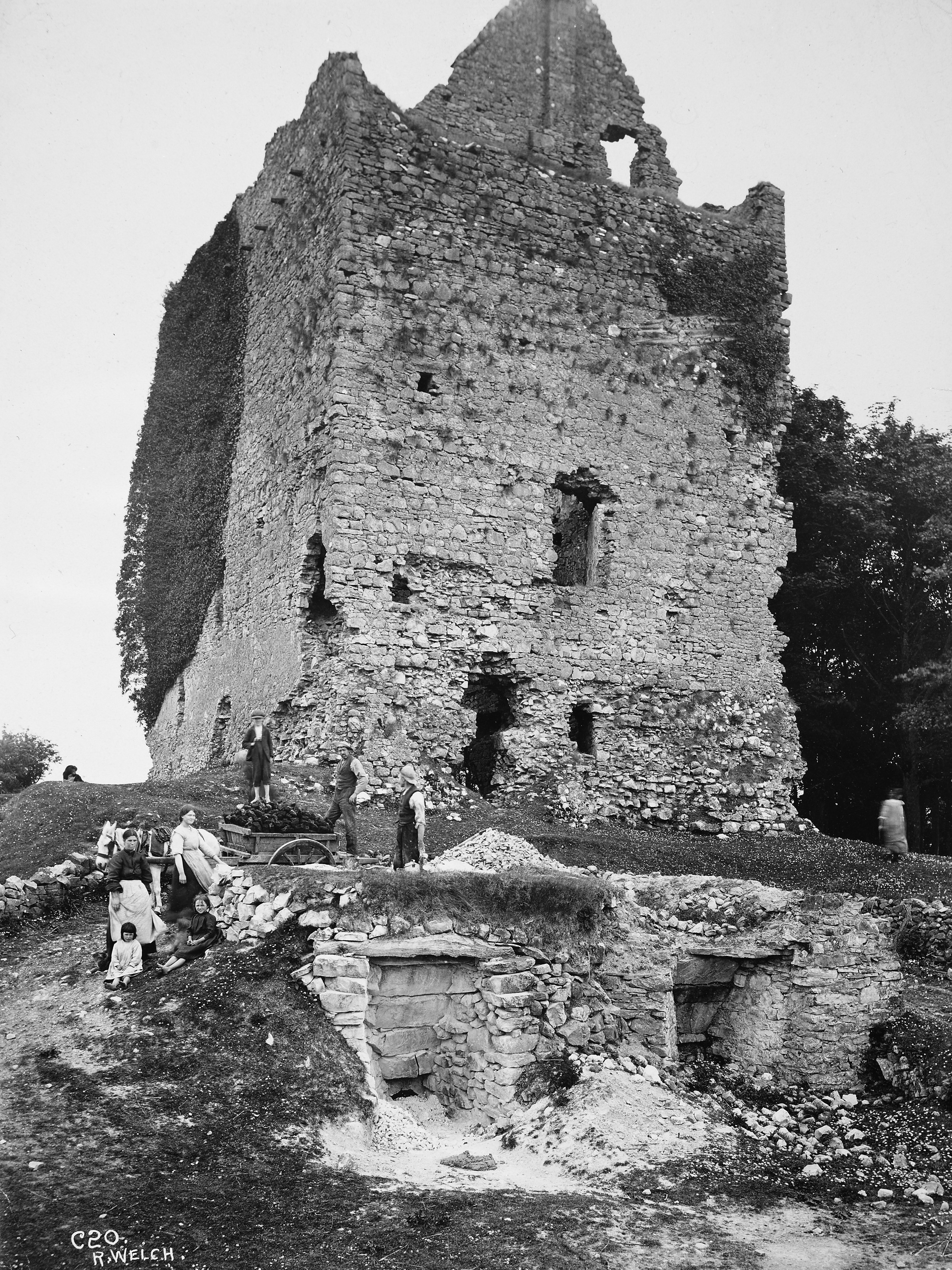
Dunmore Castle in the early 1900s

The ruins of Dunmore Castle are situated on a small hillock outside the village. The first castle at this site was built by the Anglo-Norman de-Birmingham family in the early 13th century. Designed as a bulwark against the native Irish, the castle was attacked in 1249 and burned by the O’Connors. In 1284 it was besieged by the forces of Fichra O’ Flynn. In 1315 it was once more the scene of conflict when an army, led by Rory O'Connor, attacked and damaged the fortress.

== Sport ==
Dunmore McHales is the local Gaelic Athletic Association club.

The local association football (soccer) club, Dunmore Town AFC, was founded in 1979 and fields some underage teams in the Roscommon League.

Dunmore RFC was founded in 1977 and Dunmore Demesne Golf Club in 1998.

== International relations ==
Dunmore is twinned with the village of Querrien in France.

== Notable people ==
- Michael J. Kennedy (1900–1978), Irish melodeon player
- Michael Donnellan (1900–1964), Clann na Talmhan politician
- Gideon Ouseley (1762–1839), evangelical preacher
- Henry Mossop (1729–1773), actor
- Tairrdelbach Ua Conchobair (1088–1156), King of Ireland

== See also ==
- List of abbeys and priories in Ireland (County Galway)
- List of towns and villages in Ireland
- Conmaicne Dúna Móir
