= Church of St Barnabas, Pimlico =

Coordinates: 51.4904°N 0.1518°W

Church of St Barnabas
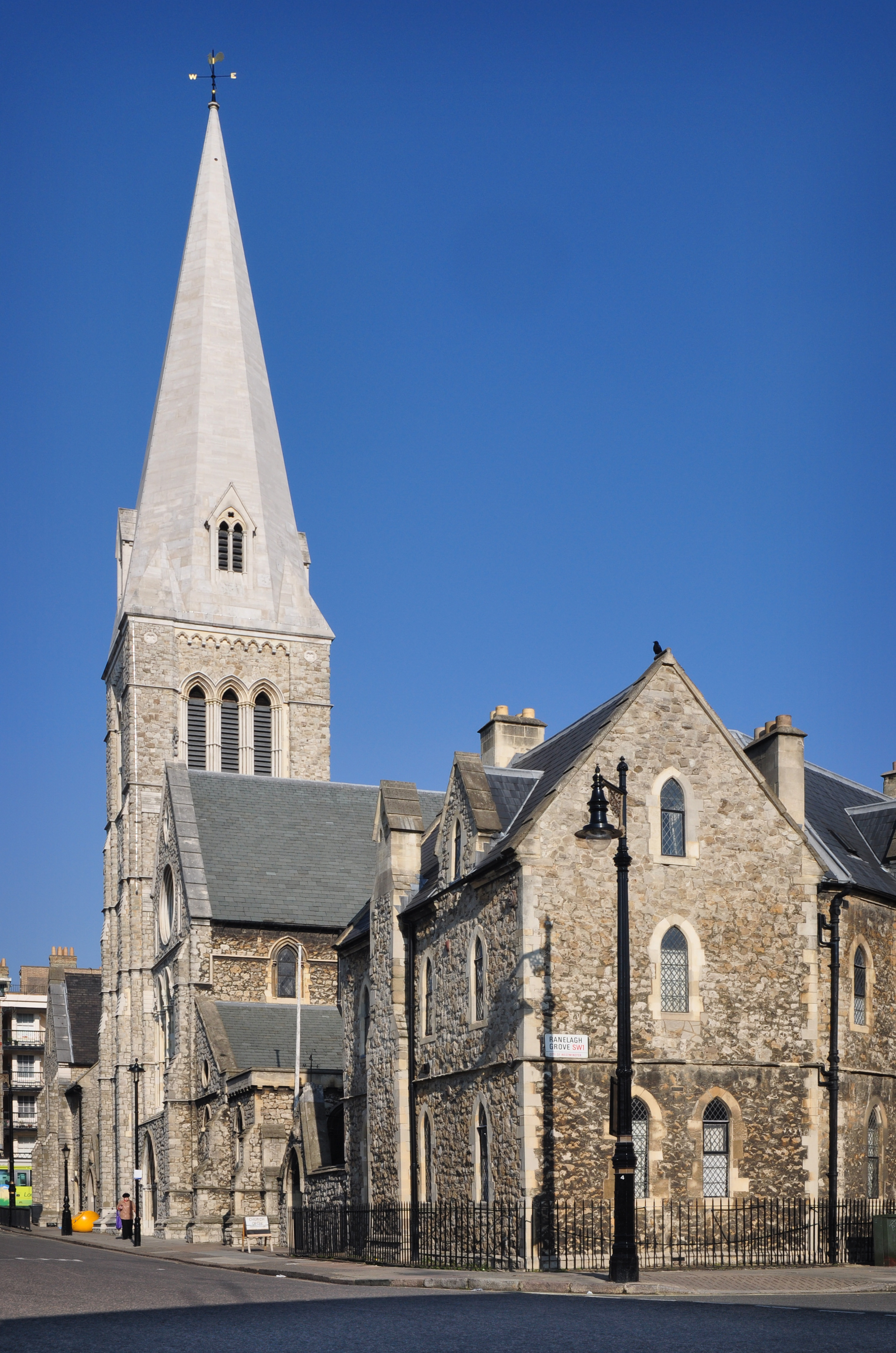
- The church and parsonage
- Church of St Barnabas
- Location: St Barnabas Street, Pimlico, London, SW1W 8PF
- Country: England
- Denomination: Church of England
- Churchmanship: Traditional Catholic

History
- Status: Active

Architecture
- Functional status: Parish church
- Heritage designation: Grade I listed
- Architect: Thomas Cundy
- Years built: 1850

Administration
- Diocese: Diocese of London
- Archdeaconry: Archdeaconry of Charing Cross
- Deanery: Westminster St Margaret
- Parish: St Barnabas, Pimlico

The Church of St Barnabas is a Church of England parish church in Pimlico, London. It is a Grade I listed building. The church is noted for its Anglo-Catholic tradition, and it "was the first church built in England where the ideals and beliefs of what came to be known as Anglo-Catholic movement were embodied in its architecture and liturgy".

== History ==
The church was built in 1847–1850 to designs of Thomas Cundy (junior), assisted by William Butterfield. It was one of the earliest Ritualistic churches, and the first in London in which all pews were free (charging for pews was normal practice at the time). Three paintings in the crypt are by Charles Edgar Buckeridge.

In 1958 the church was designated as a Grade I listed building.

== Notable clergy ==
- W. J. E. Bennett, perpetual curate
- Alfred Gurney, vicar
- John Hudson, curate, later Bishop of Carpentaria
- Charles Lowder, curate, founder of the Society of the Holy Cross
- Frederick Ouseley, curate
- Victor Shearburn, curate, later Bishop of Rangoon
- George Ratcliffe Woodward, curate

== Gallery ==
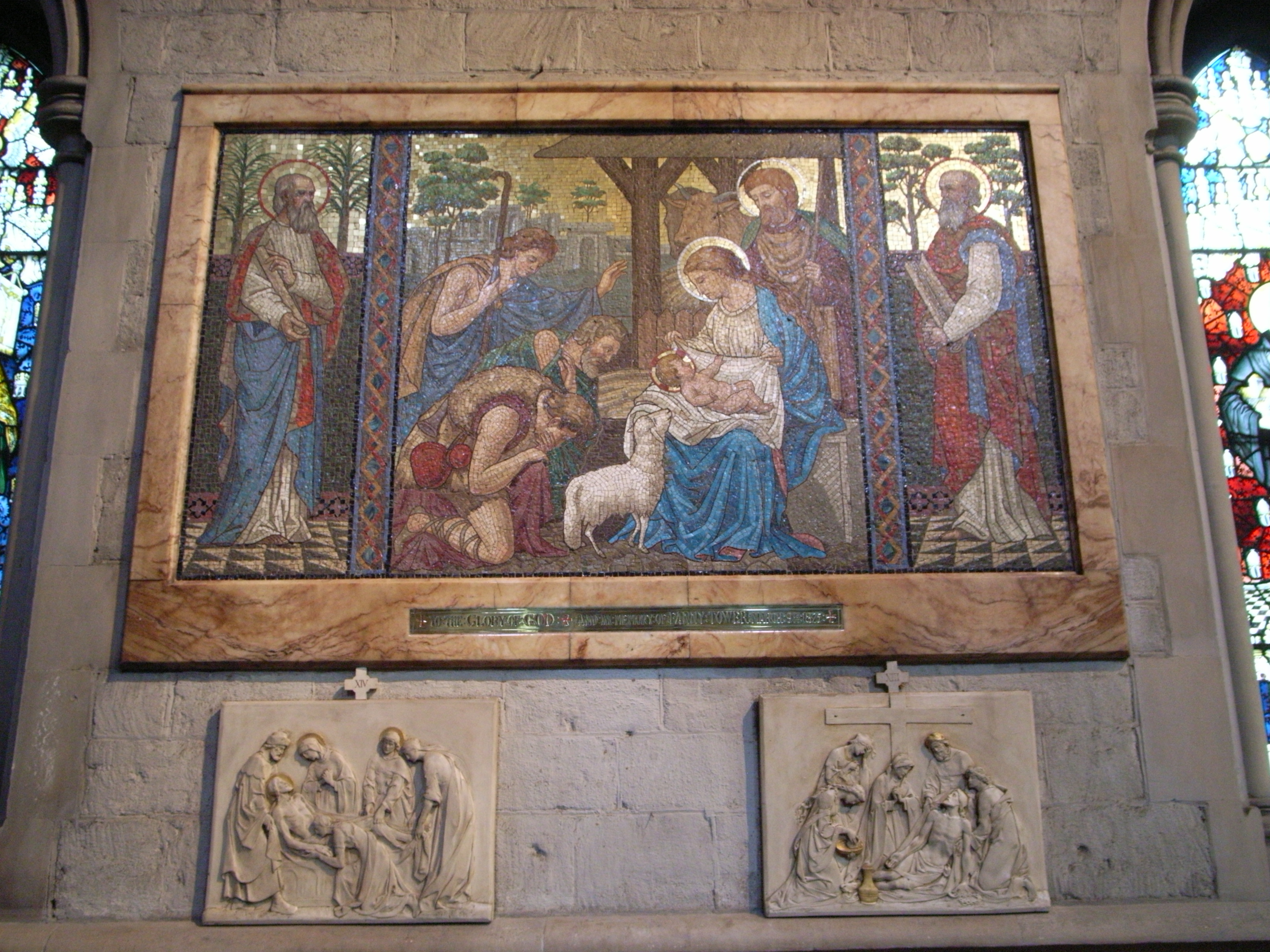
Mosaic of the nativity with a shepherd

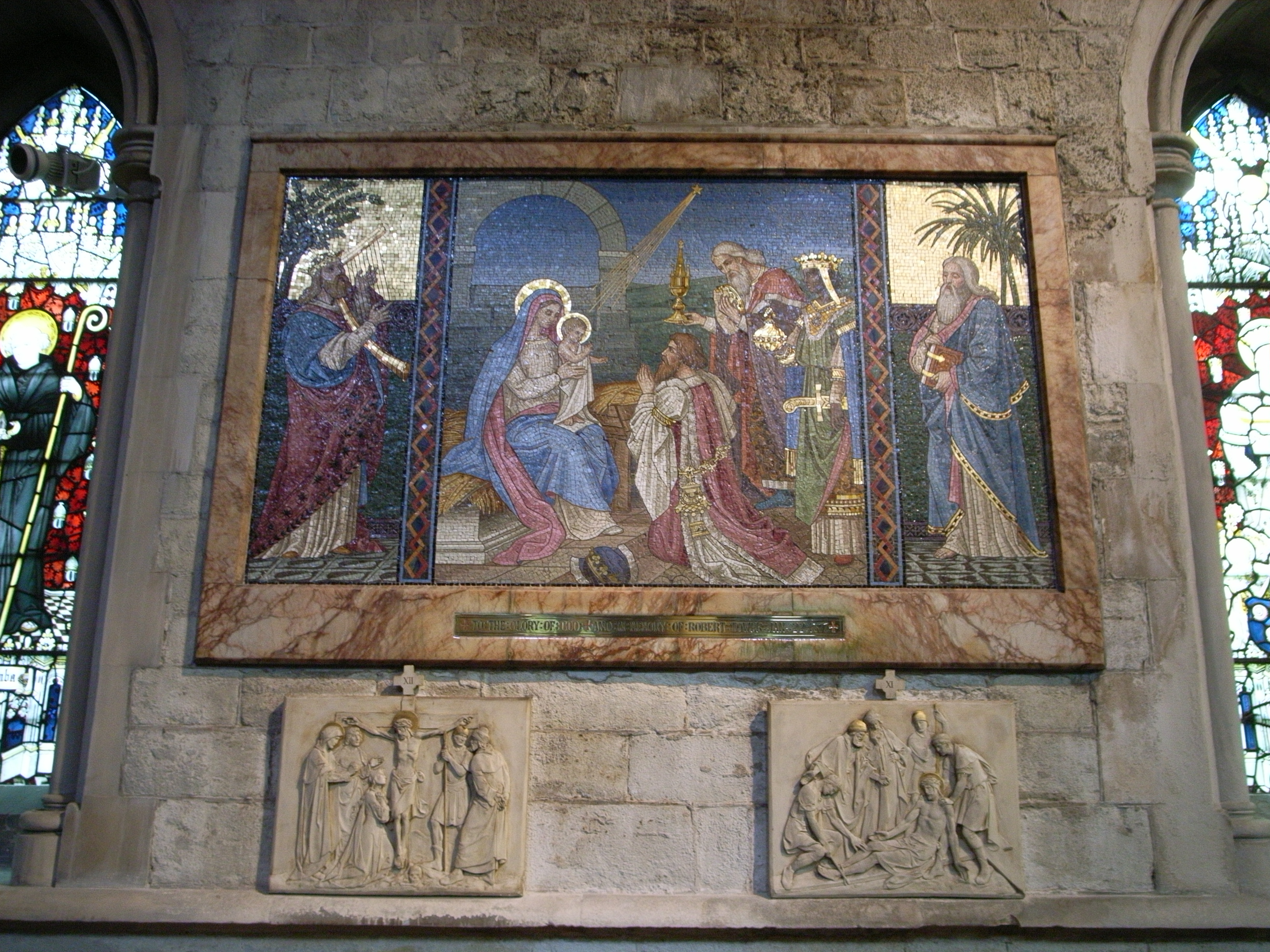
Mosaic of the nativity with the Magi

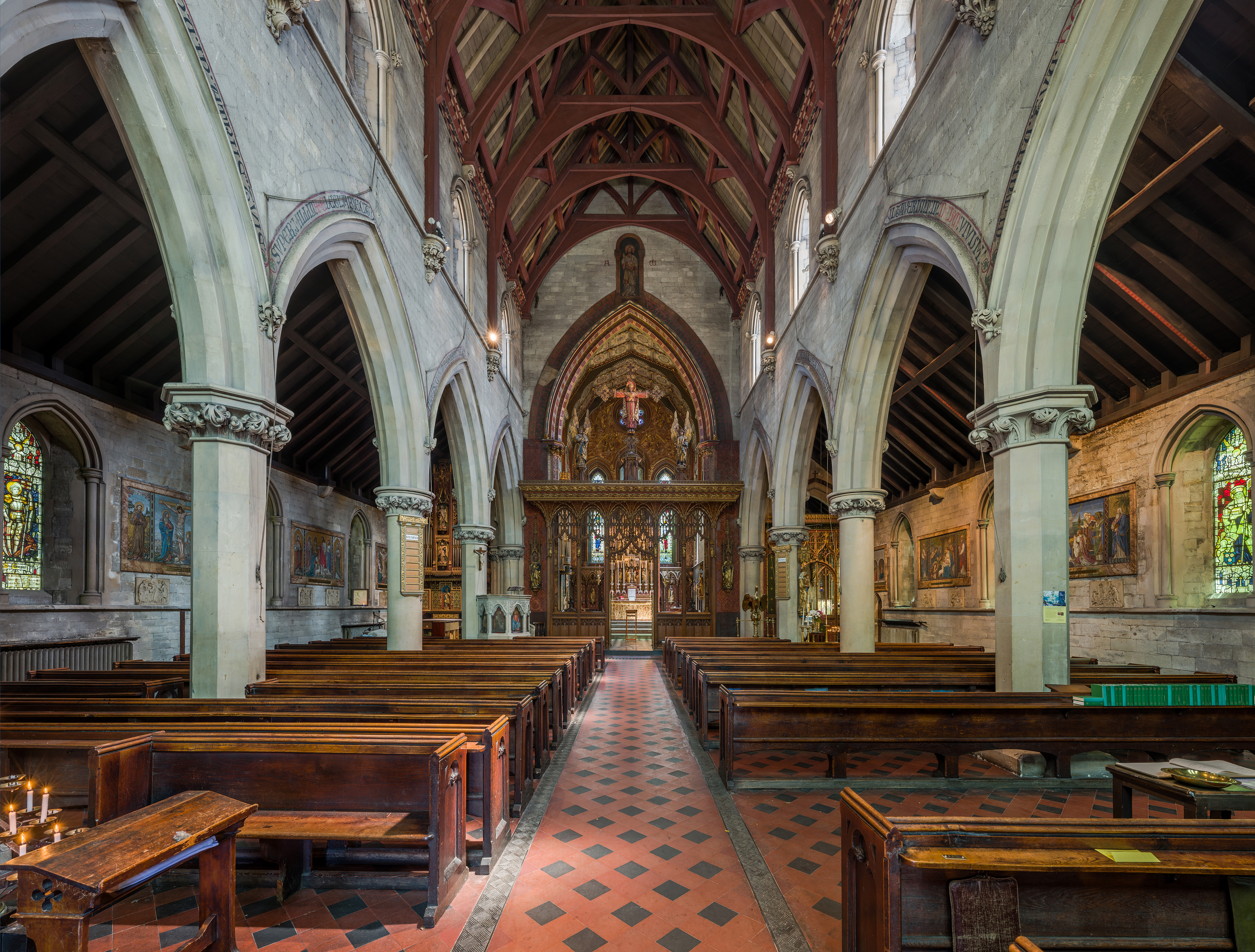
The nave

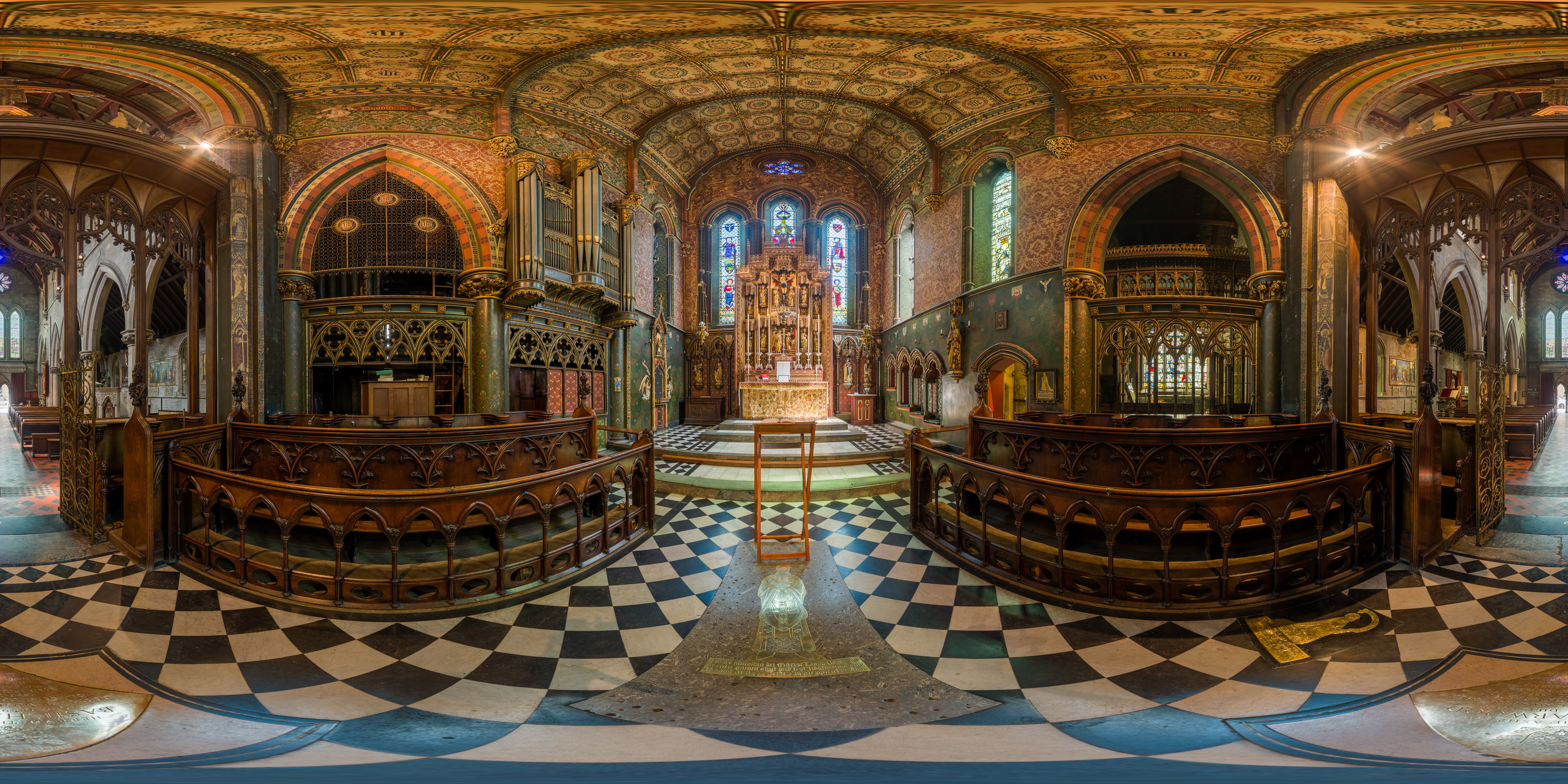
The chancel (view as a 360° interactive panorama)

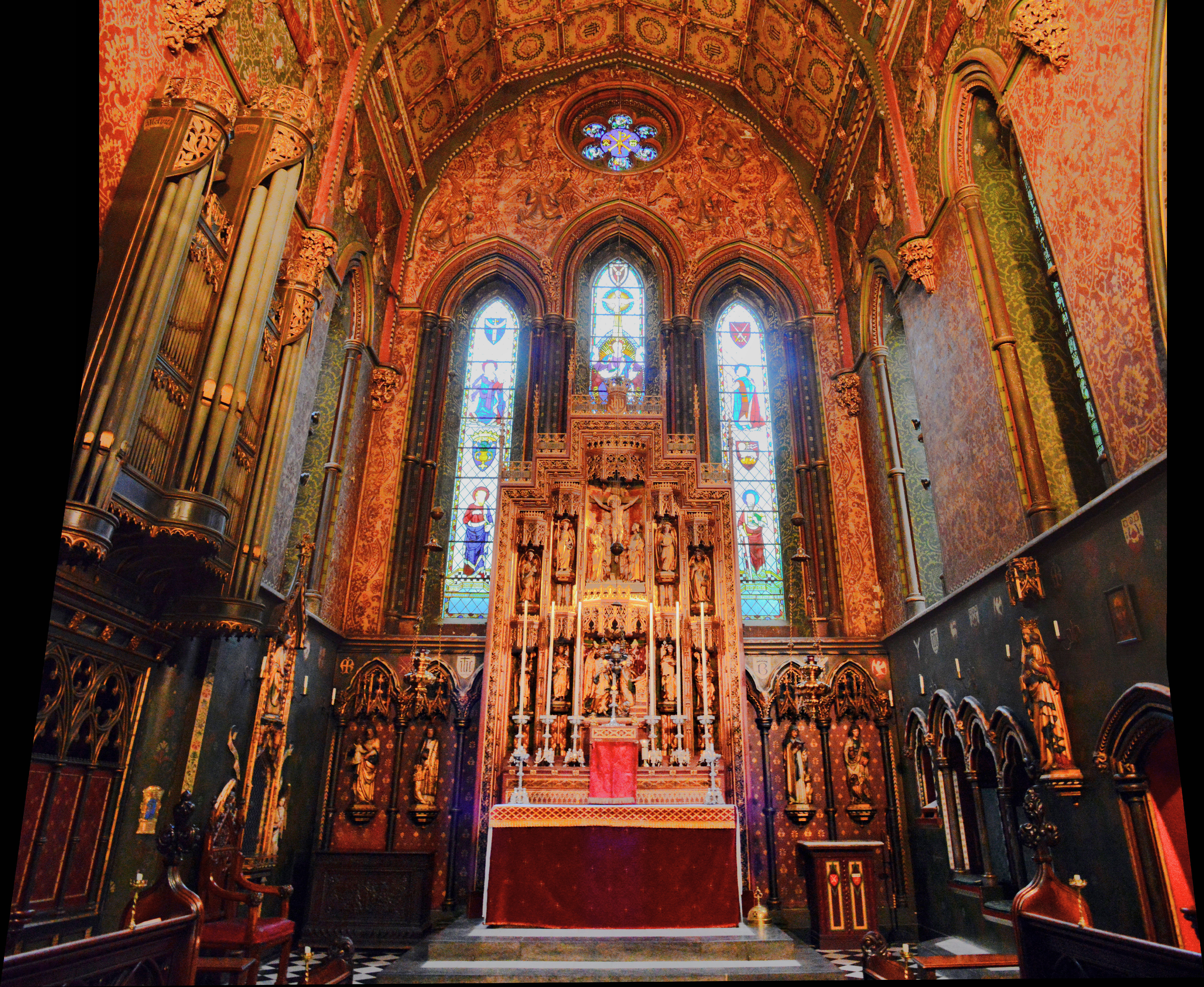
The altar

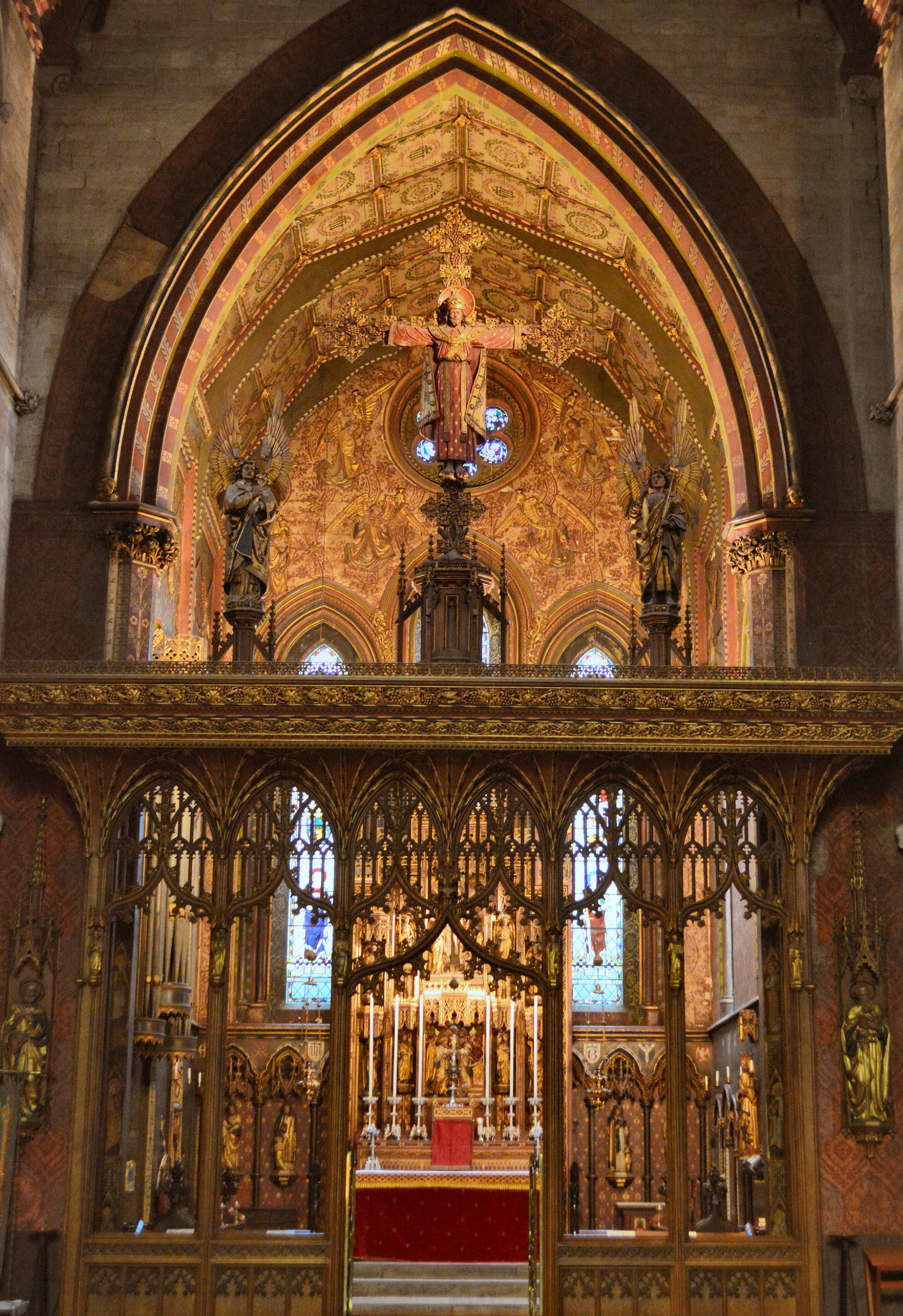
The screen designed by Bodley (1906), who also designed the organ case and reredos
