= Gore Ouseley =

British entrepreneur, linguist and diplomat

The Right Honourable Sir Gore Ouseley Bt GCH
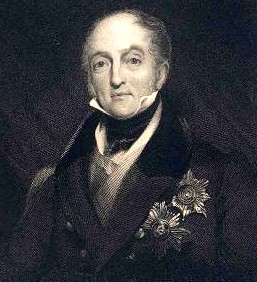
- Sir Gore Ouseley with two distinguished orders
- Born: 24 June 1770; Limerick
- Died: 18 November 1844 (aged 74); Beaconsfield, Buckinghamshire
- Occupations: Trader, diplomat and linguist
- Spouse: Harriet Georgina Whitelocke
- Children: Four sons (two in India, two in England), three daughters, inc. Frederick Ouseley
- Parent: Captain Ralph Ouseley

Sir Gore Ouseley, 1st Baronet, GCH (24 June 1770 – 18 November 1844), was a British entrepreneur, linguist and diplomat. He was born in 1770 and died at Hall Barn Park, Beaconsfield, Buckinghamshire in 1844. He negotiated an important treaty between Russia and Persia in 1813 which redrew their common borders.

== Early life ==
Sir Gore Ouseley was born in Limerick (Note: Some sources say Monmouthshire) in Ireland to Ralph and Elizabeth (born Holland) Ouseley. Gore's father's family was originally from Shropshire. Gore and his brother were tutored at home in the company of brother William and cousin Gideon Ouseley. All three had notable careers.

== India ==
Whilst serving the British Government and posted in Lucknow he became a friend of the local Nawab Saadat Ali Khan and was responsible for building a palace called Dilkusha Kothi on the banks of the Gomti near Lucknow. This palace stood for about fifty years until it was damaged in the Siege of Lucknow. The palace was a copy of the English Baroque stately home of Seaton Delaval Hall. He made his name in India where he was appointed a Major-Commander. He was made a baronet in 1808 with the recommendation of Lord Wellesley. While in India, he fathered 2 sons, William Martin Claude Ouseley in 1799 and Ralph Ouseley in 1800.

== Persia ==
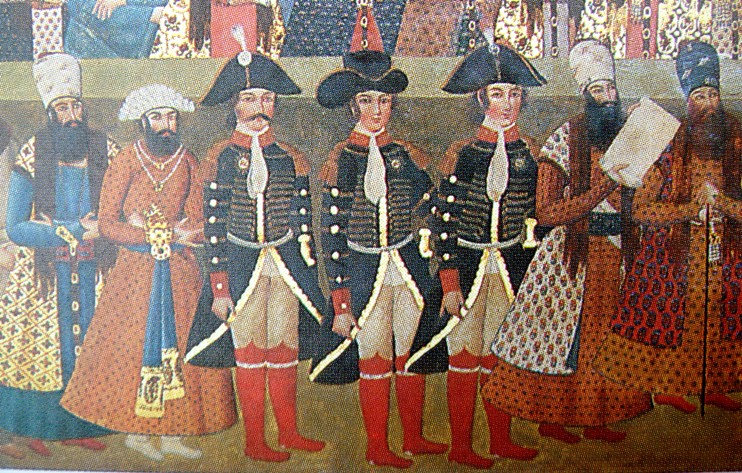
The English delegation at the Court of Fath Ali Shah in 1808: John Malcolm, Harford Jones and Gore Ouseley.

He served as ambassador to Persia from 1810 where he was involved with negotiating treaties principally with Persia and Russia. He was accompanied by his brother as secretary, Sir William Ouseley, who like Gore was a keen orientalist. Gore Ouseley was the first ambassador to Persia since Sir Dodmore Cotton was sent by Charles I. Nominally he was supporting the Shah of Persia (Fat′h Ali Shah Qajar). He allegedly bribed Persian clerics and politicians to persuade them to secure British interests in Persia. His most important undertaking was The Treaty of Gulistan: Гюлистанский договор; Persian: عهدنامه گلستان), which was prepared by the ambassador with the help of the British Foreign Office. The treaty confirmed the inclusion of modern-day Azerbaijan, Daghestan and Eastern Georgia into the Russian Empire. This was agreed on 24 October 1813. Ouseley may have visited Persepolis during his stay in Persia, as a group of reliefs from the site collected by him were donated to the British Museum in 1825.

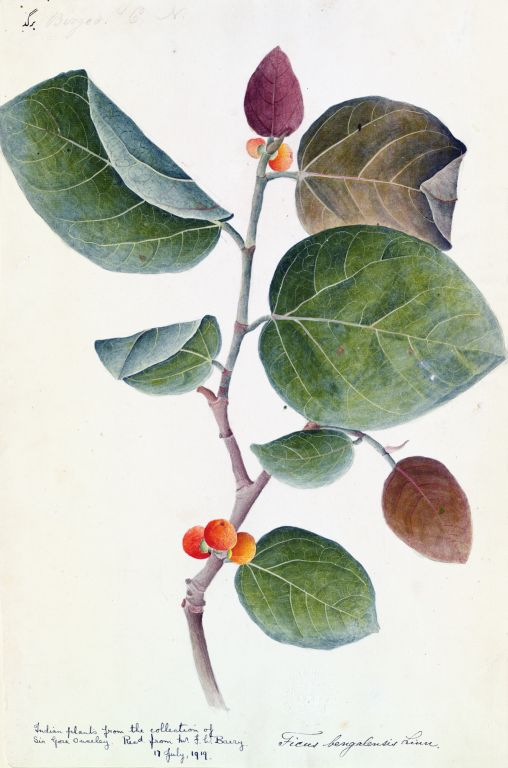
Banyan leaves and fruit – A watercolour from the collection of Gore Ouseley – now at Kew Gardens.

== Russia ==
After his brother returned to England in 1813 to write, Ouseley left the next year, stopping off in St Petersburg. While in Russia, he was awarded the Grand Cordon of the Russian Order of St. Alexander Nevsky. He was also responsible for publishing an early translation of the New Testament into Persian. The translation had been made by a friend, the Reverend Henry Martyn, and Mirza Saiyad Ali Kahn. Martyn had died on his way back to England so Ouseley agreed to arrange publication of the manuscript. This he did in St Petersburg, carrying out the proofreading personally. This version was later refined and republished in Calcutta.

== England ==
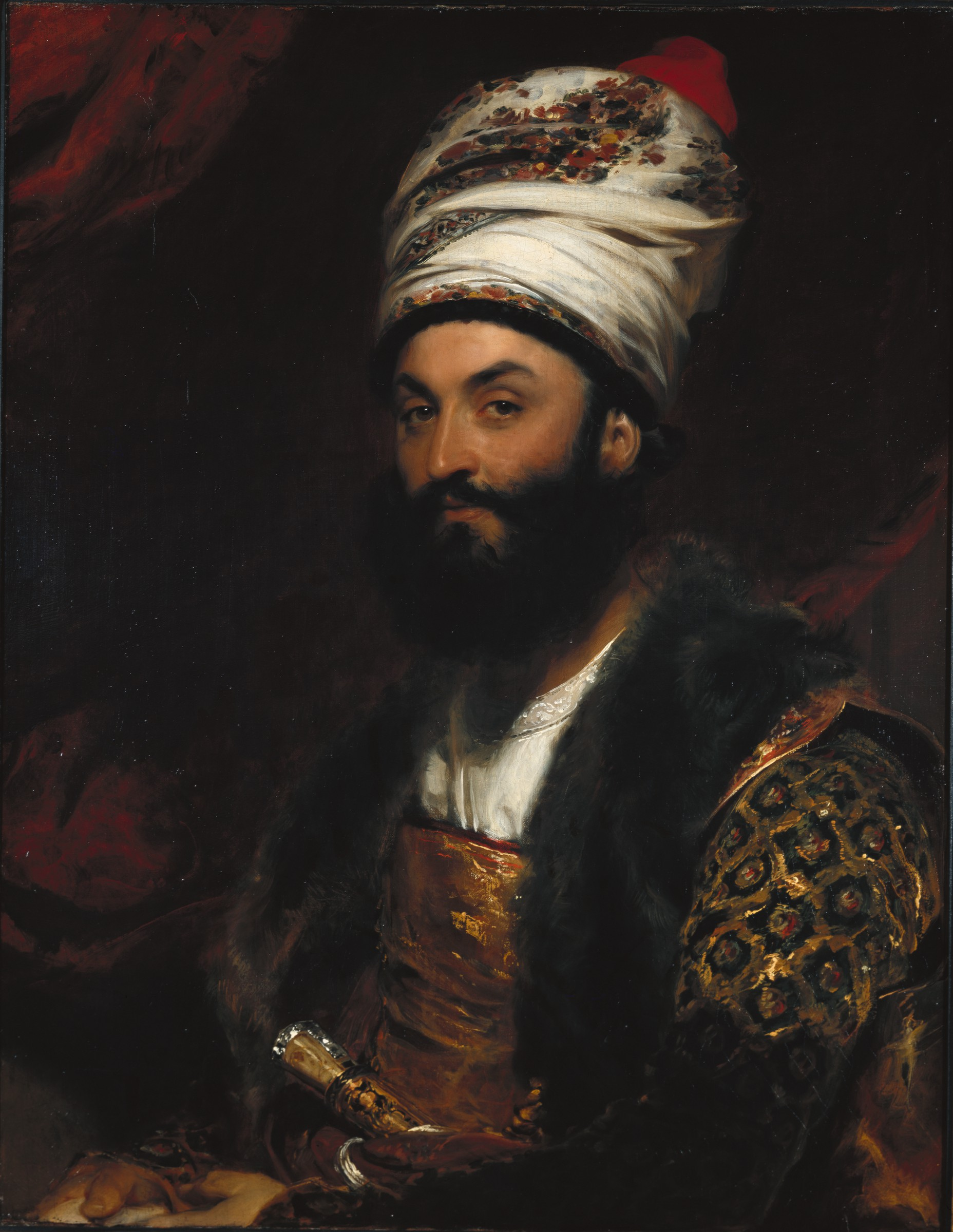
Portrait of Mirza Abul Hasan by Thomas Lawrence, 1810. Ouseley commissioned the work while the Persian envoy was in London

On his return to England in 1805, Ouseley was not made a peer as he had expected (and despite a recommendation). He brought his two sons with him back to England, and married Georgina Whitelocke. They had a further six children, none of whom married. The only one of his children to marry was his first son born in India, William Claude Ouseley, who had since immigrated to Nova Scotia with the 96th Nova Scotia Fencibles and married Rosina Weeks. William stayed in Canada where his descendants remain. Gore Ouseley's other son born in India, Ralph, became a Doctor and returned to India, subsequently dying there in 1823. See: John Mitchiner (2009) THE OUSELEYS – A FAMILY INVOLVEMENT WITH INDIA, Asian Affairs, 40:1, 1–14, DOI: 10.1080/03068370802658633

Ouseley taught himself Sanskrit, Arabic and Persian, and for enjoyment, he and his brother William advanced the study of Persia. William published a number of books, but those by Gore were not published until after his death.

In 1833, the family were living at Hall Barns, and he enjoyed gardening and building work as he had done in India. In 1835, he served as the High Sheriff of Buckinghamshire.

He became president of the Society for the Publication of the Oriental Texts in 1842 and is credited with the society's publication of Gulistan of Sa'di by Sa'di, which had a translation by Francis Gladwin.

There is a monument to his memory in Hertingfordbury Church, Hertfordshire by Thomas Denman.

His collection of Mughal paintings is at the Bodleian Library in Oxford (they were donated in 1859 by a Bengal civil servant, Mr. J. B. Elliott).

His son, The Reverend Canon Professor Sir Frederick Arthur Gore Ouseley (12 August 1825 – 6 April 1889) was an English composer, organist, and musicologist.

== Books ==
- "Remarks on the Statistics and Political Institutions of the United States, with some Observations on the Ecclesiastical System of America, her sources of Revenue, &c", 1832
- Biographical Notices of Persian Poets, 1846 (published 2 years after his death)

== Honours ==
Ouseley was created a baronet, of Claremont in the County of Hertford, in 1808. He was sworn of the Privy Council in 1820 and created a Knight Grand Cross of the Royal Guelphic Order in 1831. Among his foreign decorations were the Persian Order of the Lion and the Sun and the Russian Grand Cordon of the Order of St Alexander Nevsky. He was High Sheriff of Buckinghamshire in 1835.

Ouseley was a Fellow of the Royal Society and a Fellow of the Society of Antiquaries. He was the president of the Society for the Publication of Oriental Texts.

Diplomatic posts
| Preceded by Sir Harford Jones | British Ambassador to Persia; 1810–1814 | Succeeded by James Morier (ad interim) |
Honorary titles
| Preceded by George Simon Harcourt | High Sheriff of Buckinghamshire; 1835 | Succeeded by Thomas Tyrwhitt-Drake |
Baronetage of the United Kingdom
| New creation | Baronet (of Claremont); 1808–1844 | Succeeded by Frederick Ouseley |
