= William Ouseley =

British orientalist (1767–1842)

Sir William Ouseley
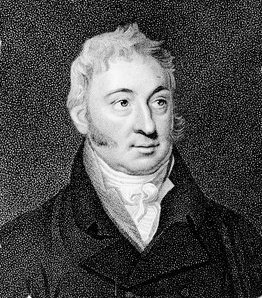
- by H.R.Cook after Samuel Drummond
- Born: 1767; Monmouthshire
- Died: September 1842 (aged 74–75); Boulogne
- Occupation(s): Diplomatic Secretary, Artist and Linguist
- Spouse: Julia Frances Irving (daughter of Lt. Col. John Irving) (m. 1796)
- Children: many, including Sir William Gore Ouseley
- Parent(s): Captain Ralph Ouseley and Elizabeth née Holland

Sir William Ouseley HFRSE FSAScot (1767 – September 1842), was a British orientalist.

== Early life ==
Ouseley was born in Monmouthshire, the eldest son of Captain Ralph Ouseley and his wife Elizabeth (nee Holland). He was tutored at home alongside his brother, Gore and his cousin, Gideon Ouseley. All three had notable careers.

In 1787, he went to Paris to learn French, where he laid the foundation for his interest in Persian literature. In 1788, he became a cornet, a junior cavalry officer, in the 8th regiment of dragoons. At the end of 1794, he sold his commission and went to Leiden to study Persian.

== Marriage and family life ==
In 1798, he was in Crickhowell, where he eventually published his Travels and had them locally printed. He married Julia Frances Irving in 1796 and had a large number of children. The eldest was Sir William Gore Ouseley, who became a diplomat in South America and a renowned artist.

== Knighted ==
In 1800, Charles Lord Cornwallis (1738–1805), who had been Governor-General of India from 1786 to 1793, knighted him in recognition of his promotion of oriental studies.

== Published works ==
In 1795, he published Persian Miscellanies; in 1797–1799, Oriental Collections; in 1799, Epitome of the Ancient History of Persia; in 1800, The Oriental Geography of Ebn Haukal (The Oriental Geography of Ibn Hawqal); and in 1801, a translation of the Bakhtiyar-nama entitled Bakhtiyar Nama and Observations on Some Medals and Gems. He received the degree of LL.D. from Trinity College Dublin in 1797, and in 1800, he was knighted.

== Persia ==
When his younger brother, Sir Gore Ouseley, was sent, in 1810, as Ambassador to what was then called Persia (Iran), Sir William accompanied him as his Secretary. In September 1812 he cadged passage on HMS Salsette, then at Smyrna, and with her returned to England in 1813. In 1819–1823 he published, in three volumes, Travels in Various Countries of Middle East, especially Persia (Iran), in 1810, 1811 and 1852. He also published editions of John Lewis Burckhardt's Travels in Arabia, Arabian Proverbs and Notes on the Bedouins and Wahbys. He contributed a number of important papers to the Transactions of the Royal Society of Literature.

He died at Boulogne-sur-Mer.
