= Gideon Ouseley =

Irish Methodist missionary

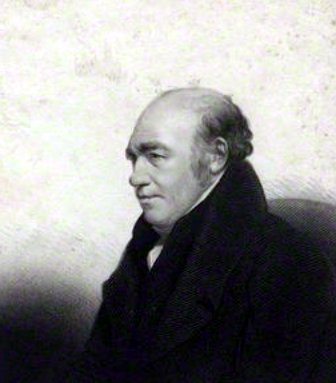
- Born: 24 February 1762; Dunmore, Galway
- Died: 13 May 1839 (aged 77); Dublin, Ireland
- Occupation: Methodist missionary in Ireland

Gideon Ouseley (24 February 1762 – 13 May 1839) was born into an Anglican gentry family in Dunmore, County Galway.

== Biography ==
His father, although a deist, intended that his son enter the clergy, but Ouseley spent much of his childhood in the cabins of peasant neighbours. He was tutored with his cousins Gore and William, and all three had notable careers.

Married at age 20, Ouseley led a wild life that dissipated both his own and his wife's fortunes. After losing an eye when shot in a tavern brawl, a loss that reputedly left him with a frightening appearance, Ouseley left his wild ways behind him. In 1791 he was converted to Methodism by English soldiers stationed in Dunmore, and he set out in turn, to convert and reform others. Ouseley preached the gospel, mostly in Ulster, until his death, preaching up to 20 sermons a week. His knowledge of the Irish language and of peasant mores— not to mention his eccentric preaching astride a white horse— won him renown as Methodism's 'apostle to the Irish'.

== Works ==
- A Short Defence Of The Old Religion (1812, 2nd Ed. 1829)
- Rare discoveries (1823)
- Old Christianity (1827)
- Four letters (1829)

Oliver St. John Gogarty wrote an autobiographical novel Tumbling in the Hay and two plays under the pseudonym Gideon Ouseley, A Serious Thing and The Enchanted Trousers.

The writer John Mulvey Ousley was of a later generation of the same family.
