= Shepherd (name) =

Family name

Shepherd is a surname, cognate of the English word "Shepherd". Several common spelling variations exist, including Shepperd, Sheperd, Shephard, Sheppard, and Shepard.

== Shepherd ==
=== Surname ===
- Adaline Shepherd (1883–1950), American composer
- Alan Shepherd (1935–2007), British motorcycle Grand Prix road racer
- Alfred Shepherd (1893–1917), Australian fighter ace
- Amba Shepherd (born 1991), Australian singer
- Ann Shepherd (1910–2002), American actress born Shaindel Kalish
- Briana Shepherd (born c. 1987), Western Australian journalist, reporter and news presenter, former New York City Ballet dancer
- Chandler Shepherd (born 1992), American professional baseball player (Boston Americans)
- Cybill Shepherd (born 1950), American actress
- Darrius Shepherd (born 1995), American football player
- David Shepherd (disambiguation)
- Dolly Shepherd (1886–1983), English hot-air balloon trapeze artist
- F. H. S. Shepherd (1877–1948), English painter
- Frances Alice Shepherd (fl. 1970s–2020s), Canadian academic
- Freddy Shepherd (1941–2017), businessman and chairman of Newcastle United
- George Shepherd (artist) (1784–1862), English draughtsman and watercolourist
- George Shepherd, 1st Baron Shepherd (1881–1954), British Labour politician
- Gordon Shepherd (disambiguation), several people
- Haven Shepherd (born 2003), American swimmer
- Henry John Shepherd (1784–1855), English politician
- J. Marshall Shepherd (fl. 1990s–2020s), American meteorologist
- Jack Shepherd (disambiguation), multiple people
- JaCorey Shepherd (born 1993), American football player
- Jean Shepherd (1921–1999), American radio personality and writer
- Jenny Shepherd (born 1972), New Zealand field hockey player
- Joel Shepherd (born 1974), Australian science fiction author
- John Shepherd (disambiguation), several people
- Jonathan Shepherd (fl. 1970s–2020s), Welsh surgeon
- Karen Shepherd (born 1940), U.S. Representative from Utah
- Keith Shepherd (born 1968), major league baseball player
- Kenny Wayne Shepherd (born Kenneth Wayne Brobst; 1977), an American blues guitarist, singer and songwriter
- Kirk Shepherd (born 1986), English darts player
- Lisa Shepherd, American politician
- Leo Shepherd (fl. 1940s–1950s), US jazz trumpeter
- Malcolm Shepherd, 2nd Baron Shepherd (1918–2001), British Labour politician
- Mark Shepherd (businessman) (1923–2009), chairman and CEO of Texas Instruments
- Mark Shepherd (novelist) (1961–2011), author of several fantasy novels
- Mark Allen Shepherd (born 1961), actor
- Lady Mary Shepherd (1777–1847), British philosopher
- Mary Patricia Shepherd (1933–2003), British thoracic surgeon
- Michael Shepherd (psychiatrist) (1923–1995), British psychiatrist and author
- Morgan Shepherd (born 1941), NASCAR driver
- Nancy Shepherd (born 1954), American politician
- Nathan Shepherd (born 1993), Canadian-American football player
- Noma Shepherd (1935–2023), New Zealand community leader
- Robbie Shepherd (1936–2023), Scottish broadcaster and author
- Robert Shepherd (1937–2008), law professor
- Robert Shepherd (TV producer) (born 1949), British documentary maker and author
- Robert Shepherd (footballer) (born 1956), Australian rules footballer
- Romario Shepherd, (born 1994) Guyanese and West Indian cricketer
- Roy Shepherd (born 1931), British ice hockey player
- Roy Shepherd (pianist) (1907–1986), Australian pianist and teacher
- Russell B. Shepherd (1829–1901), American politician
- Sanger Shepherd (fl. 1900s–1920s), British inventor of an early colour photography process
- Sherri Shepherd (born 1967), media personality, actress and comedian
- Thomas D. Shepherd (1889–1954), American college football player and coach
- Thomas H. Shepherd (1792–1864), British architectural artist
- William Robert Shepherd (1871–1934), American cartographer and historian

=== Given name ===
- Shepherd Brooks, member of a prominent Medford family who developed the 19th-century Shepherd Brooks Estate
- Shepherd Gundu Chengeta (1966–2023), Zimbabwean politician
- Shepherd Clark (born 1971), American competitive figure skater
- Shepherd Dawson (1880–1935), British psychologist
- Shepherd Heyward (died 1859), free black man who was killed during the raid on Harpers Ferry
- Shepherd Leffler (1811–1879), U.S. Representative from Iowa
- Shepherd Mead (1914–1994), born Edward Mead, American writer
- Shepherd Murape (born 1949), Zimbabwean former football player and manager
- Shepherd Skanes (fl. 2000s–2020s), American football coach

=== Fictional Shepherds ===
- Derrial Book (a.k.a. Shepherd Book), character in the television series, Firefly
- Alex Shepherd, character from the Silent Hill series
- Derek Shepherd, character on the ABC television series Grey's Anatomy and Private Practice
- Amelia Shepherd, character on the ABC television series Private Practice and Grey's Anatomy
- Erma Shepherd, is the captain of the Rescue Corps in Pikmin 4
- General Herschel Shepherd, the main antagonist from video game Call of Duty: Modern Warfare 2
- Lieutenant General Shepherd, one-off mission-exclusive character in the DLC missions of Ace Combat 7: Skies Unknown
- Jason Shepherd, the main protagonist of the film Big Fat Liar
- Tommy Shepherd, a superhero from Marvel Comics
- Terry Musa (codenamed Shepherd), an operator in Delta Force (2025 video game)

== Shepperd ==
=== Surname ===
- Augustine Henry Shepperd (1792–1864), U.S. representative from North Carolina
- Robin Shepperd, British television director

=== Given name ===
- Shepperd Strudwick, American actor of film, television and stage
- William Shepperd Ashe, Democratic U.S. Congressman from North Carolina between 1849 and 1855

=== Other uses ===
- Shepperd's Dell, a small canyon in the Columbia River Gorge in Oregon

== Sheperd ==
=== Surname ===
- Howard C. Sheperd (1894–1980), American businessman
- Karen Sheperd (born 1961), American actress and martial artist

=== Given name ===
- Sheperd S. Doeleman (born 1967), American astrophysicist
- Sheperd Paine (1946–2015), American military historian

== Shephard ==
=== Surname ===
- Ben Shephard (born 1974), English television presenter
- Ben Shephard (historian) (1948–2017), English historian
- Esther Shephard (1891–1975), American writer
- Garry Shephard (born 1976), former Welsh professional footballer
- Geoffrey Colin Shephard (1927–2016), British mathematician
- Gillian Shephard, Baroness Shephard of Northwold (born 1940), British Conservative politician
- Gordon Strachey Shephard (1885–1918), Indian-born British Brigadier-General killed in action
- Hale Horatio Shephard (1842–1921), British judge in India
- Michelle Shephard (born 1972), Canadian journalist
- Neil Shephard (born 1964), British economist
- Richard Shephard (1949–2021), British choral music composer
- Ronald Shephard (1912–1982), American economist
- Rupert Shephard (1909–1992), English artist
- Sidney Shephard (1894–1953), British politician

=== Given name ===
- Shephard Mayer (1923–2005), Canadian ice hockey player

=== Other uses ===
- Shephard's lemma
- Shephard's problem
- Chevalley–Shephard–Todd theorem

=== Fictional Shephards ===
- Adrian Shephard, character in the computer game Half-Life: Opposing Force
- Mitchell Shephard, character in the computer game Hunt Down The Freeman
- Christian Shephard, character on the television series Lost, father of Jack Shephard
- Jack Shephard, character on the television series Lost

== Sheppard ==
=== Surname ===
- Alison Sheppard (born 1972), Scottish Olympic swimmer
- Allen Sheppard, Baron Sheppard of Didgemere (1932–2015), British industrialist
- Andy Sheppard (born 1957), British jazz saxophonist and composer
- Ashley Sheppard (born 1969), American football player
- Austin Oke Sheppard (1844–1927), British colony of Newfoundland, 3rd generation lighthouse keeper, posts at Dodding Head, Fort Amherst and Cape Spear, grandfather of Robert Carl Sheppard
- Bob Sheppard (1910–2010), American sports announcer
- Bob Sheppard (musician) (born 1952), American jazz saxophonist
- Barbara Bohannan-Sheppard (born 1950), American politician
- Charles Bradford Sheppard (fl. 1940s), American radio and electrical engineer
- Chris Sheppard (born 1963), Jamaican-Canadian disc jockey and musician
- Chris Sheppard (rugby league) (born 1981), Australian rugby player
- Colin Sheppard, British engineering professor
- Curtis Sheppard (born c. 1919), American boxer
- Dave Sheppard (1931–2000), American weightlifter and Olympic medalist
- David Sheppard (1929–2005), English cricketer and bishop
- David Sheppard (broadcaster) (born 1981), British radio presenter
- Dick Sheppard (priest) (1880–1937), English clergyman and pacifist
- Dick Sheppard (footballer) (1945–1998), English football goalkeeper
- Eleanor P. Sheppard (1907–1991), American politician
- Elizabeth Sheppard (1830–1862), British novelist
- Ella Sheppard (1851–1914), American singer and composer of spirituals
- Emma Sheppard (1813–1871), English writer and workhouse reformer
- Fleetwood Sheppard (1634–1698), British poet
- Francis Sheppard (1921–2018), British historian
- Francis M. Sheppard (1868–1948) American politician
- Gerrard Sheppard (born 1990), American football player
- Harriet Sheppard (1786–1858), Canadian botanist
- Howard Sheppard (1933–2013), Canadian politician
- Jack Sheppard (1702–1724), English criminal
- Jack Sheppard (cave diver) (1909–2001), British cave diver
- Jack Sheppard (cricketer) (born 1992), English cricketer
- James Sheppard (born 1988), Canadian ice hockey player
- Ja'Quan Sheppard (born 2000), American football player
- Jason Sheppard (born 1978), American politician
- Jeff Sheppard (born 1974), American professional and collegiate basketball player; father of Reed Sheppard
- John Sheppard (disambiguation), multiple people
- Joseph Sheppard (born 1958), American actor
- Kate Sheppard (1848–1934), New Zealand suffragette and civil rights campaigner
- Lianne Sheppard, American statistician
- Lito Sheppard (born 1981), American football cornerback
- Loulia Sheppard (1944–2025), English hair designer
- Mark Sheppard (born 1964), English actor
- Mel Sheppard (1883–1942), American athlete
- Mike Sheppard (baseball) (1936–2019), American college baseball coach
- Mike Sheppard (American football) (born 1951), American football player and coach
- Morris Sheppard (1875–1941), American Congressman and Senator
- Moses Sheppard (1771–1857), American businessman and Quaker
- Mubin Sheppard (1905–1994), Irish-born historian of Malaysian culture
- Nate Sheppard (born 2006), American football player
- Peter Sheppard Skærved (born 1966), British violinist
- Philip Sheppard (1921–1976), British geneticist
- R. Sheppard Marble and Stone Works of Toronto, Ontario was a monumental masonry firm active in nineteenth-century Ontario
- Ray Sheppard (born 1966), Canadian ice hockey player
- Reed Sheppard (born 2004), American basketball player; son of Jeff Sheppard
- Revett Sheppard (1778–1830), British naturalist
- Richard Sheppard (architect) (1910–1982), English architect
- Rob Sheppard (fl. 1990s–2020s), American college baseball coach
- Robert Carl Sheppard, MBE (1897–1954), from the British colony of Newfoundland, WW1 veteran of the Battle of the Somme (Beaumont-Hamel, France), lighthouse keeper at Fort Amherst, NL and master mariner of two ships chartered for the British Antarctic expedition, Operation Tabarin.
- Ronald G. Sheppard (born 1939), American politician
- Sam Sheppard (1923–1970), American neurosurgeon
- Samara Sheppard (born 1990), New Zealand mountain biker
- Scott S. Sheppard (born 1977), American astronomer
- Sheppard family (clothiers), family in Frome, Somerset since 1614
- Sherri D. Sheppard (born 1956), American professor of mechanical engineering
- Simon Sheppard (writer) (1948–2021), American writer
- Simon Sheppard (activist) (born 1957), British far-right activist
- Simon Sheppard (footballer) (born 1973), English former goalkeeper
- Stephen Lea Sheppard (born 1983), Canadian television and film actor
- Thomas Sheppard (disambiguation), multiple people
- T. G. Sheppard (born 1944), American country music singer
- Trey Sheppard, American politician
- Will Sheppard (born 2002), American football player
- William Sheppard (disambiguation), multiple people

=== Given name ===
- Sheppard Frere (1916–2015), British historian and archaeologist
- Sheppard Homans Jr. (1871–1952), All-American football player and insurance executive
- Sheppard J. Shreaves (1885–1968), dockmaster, shipwright and diver
- Sheppard Solomon (born 1969), American songwriter

=== Fictional Sheppards ===
- John Sheppard (Stargate), lieutenant colonel in the United States Air Force played by Joe Flanigan in the television series Stargate Atlantis
- James Sheppard, the narrator in The Murder of Roger Ackroyd by Agatha Christie
- Bruno Sheppard, an antagonist in M.A.S.K. (TV series)
- Principal Sheppard, a fictional character in Degrassi: The Next Generation

== Shepard ==
=== Surname ===
- Alan Shepard (1923–1998), American astronaut
- Alexandra Shepard (fl. 2000s–2020s), Scottish historian
- Anna O. Shepard (1903–1971), American archaeologist
- Annie Bartlett Shepard (1861–1944), American conservative activist
- Bert Shepard (1920–2008), American WWII pilot & baseball player
- Cheryl Shepard (born 1966), American actress
- Lil Gnar (born Caleb Shepard; 1996), American singer and rapper
- Cecelia Shepard (c. 1947–1969), victim of the Zodiac Killer
- David Shepard (film preservationist) (1940–2017), American film preservationist
- David H. Shepard (1923–2007), American inventor
- Dax Shepard (born 1975), American actor, comedian, writer, and director
- Elliott Fitch Shepard (1833–1893), American lawyer, banker, and newspaper editor
- E. H. Shepard (1879–1976), British artist and illustrator
- Edward M. Shepard (1850–1911), American lawyer and political reformer
- Irene Shepard (1922–2014), American educator and politician
- Isaac F. Shepard (1816–1899), American Civil War officer
- Jan Shepard (1928–2025), American actress
- Jean Shepard (1933–2016), American honky tonk singer and songwriter
- Jessica Shepard (born 1996), American basketball player
- Kiki Shepard (1951–2026), American television host
- Lorenzo B. Shepard (1821–1856), American lawyer and politician
- Louis C. Shepard (1841–1919), American Civil War Medal of Honor recipient
- Lucius Shepard (1943–2014), American science fiction and fantasy writer
- Marshall L. Shepard (1899–1967), American politician
- Mary Shepard (1909–2000), British illustrator
- Matt Shepard (sportscaster) (born c. 1965), Detroit, Michigan TV sports commentator
- Matthew Shepard (1976–1998), American victim of a hate crime
- Norman Shepard (1897–1977), American college sports coach
- Roger Shepard (1929–2020), American cognitive scientist
- Sam Shepard (1943–2017), American playwright and actor
- Sara Shepard (born 1977), American author
- Scott Shepard, American politician
- Thomas Shepard (minister) (1605–1649), Puritan minister in colonial America
- Thomas Z. Shepard (born 1936), American recording producer, composer, and conductor
- Vonda Shepard (born 1963), American singer
- William Shepard (1737–1817), former U.S. Representative from Massachusetts

=== Given name ===
- Shepard Barclay (1847–1925), justice of the Supreme Court of Missouri
- Shepard Broad (1906–2001), American banker and lawyer
- Shepard Cary (1805–1866), U.S. Representative from Maine
- Shepard Fairey (born 1970), American artist
- Shepard Smith (born 1964), American TV anchor

=== Fictional Shepards ===
- Adrian Shepard, main character of Half-Life: Opposing Force, an expansion pack for the first-person shooter game Half-Life.
- Commander Shepard, main character of the Mass Effect video games.
- Tim Shepard, character from S.E. Hinton's novel The Outsiders. He has siblings Curly Shepard and Angela Shepard, featuring in Hinton's novel That Was Then, This Is Now
- Shepard (comics), character in the Marvel Comics Universe
- Director Jenny Shepard, character on the TV series NCIS

== See also ==
- General Shepherd (disambiguation)
- Shepherd (disambiguation)
- Shepard (disambiguation)
- Sheppard (disambiguation)
