= Scania (disambiguation) =

Scania (Skåne) is the southernmost province of Sweden.

Scania may also refer to:

People

- Duke of Scania
- Duchess of Scania

Places

- 460 Scania, asteroid named after the province of Scania

Companies

- Scania AB (Scania-Vabis), Swedish automotive manufacturer with origins in Scania
- Maskinfabriks-aktiebolaget Scania, predecessor to Scania-Vabis
- Saab-Scania, former parent company of Scania-Vabis

Other uses

- Scania Party, separatist political party
- Scania (moth)''Scania'' (moth), a genus of moth
- Scania goose, a breed of domestic geese
- Scania Market, annual market for herring in Scania during the Middle Ages
- Scania Arena, an arena in Duisburg, Germany
- Scania, a server in the Korean role-playing game MapleStory
- USS Scania, a U.S. Navy ship name
- USS Scania (AKA-40), an Artemis-class attack cargo ship

== See also ==
- Scanian War (1675-1679)
- Skåne (disambiguation)
- Skåneland, the wider region including Scania, sometimes referred to as "the Scanian provinces"
