= Western Railroad Stone Arch Bridges and Chester Factory Village Depot =

- U.S. National Register of Historic Places
- U.S. National Historic Landmark District
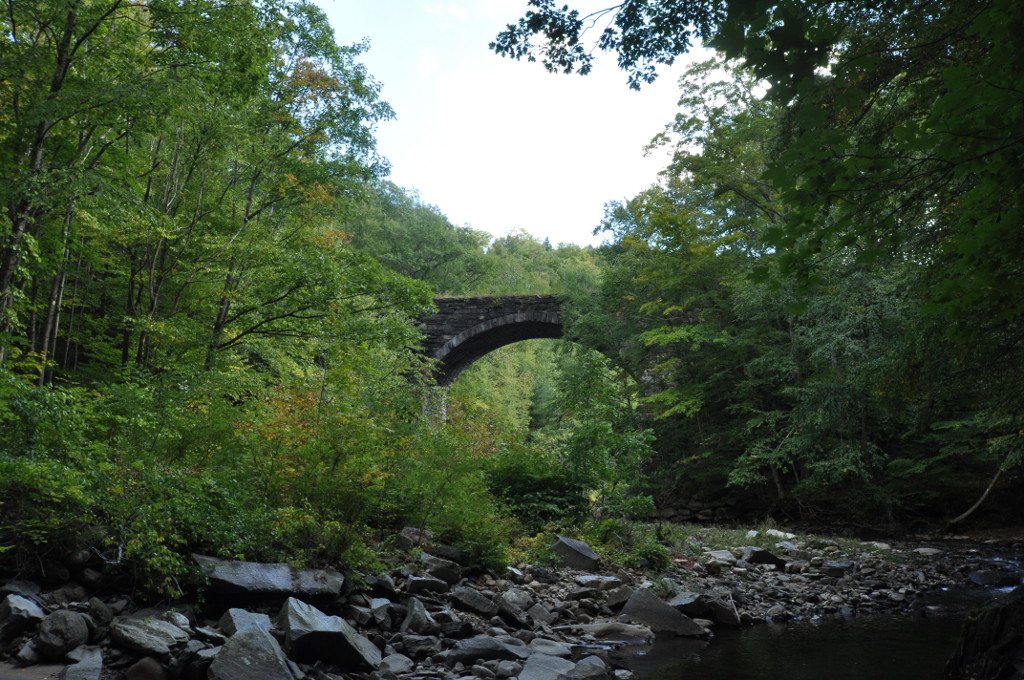
- Bridge #5

- Location within Massachusetts Location within the United States
- Nearest city: Chester, Massachusetts
- Coordinates: 42°18′45.6″N 72°59′38.3″W
- Area: about 5 acres (2.0 ha)
- Built: 1840
- Architect: George Washington Whistler
- NRHP reference No.: 100006273
- Added to NRHP: January 13, 2021

The Western Railroad Stone Arch Bridges and Chester Factory Village Depot is a National Historic Landmark District extending through parts of the towns of Chester, Middlefield, and Becket, Massachusetts. It encompasses a section of the historic Western Railroad railbed, two stone bridges constructed in the 1840s under the direction of George Washington Whistler, and the c. 1862 railroad depot in the village of Chester Factory, which served the railroad as an important logistics point for the difficult crossing of The Berkshires to the west. The section of railroad was the most expensive the company had to build, costing over $1 million in 1840. A hiking trail providing viewing points to the lower seven bridges was opened in 2004. All of the bridges are viewable via whitewater-appropriate watercraft from the river.

These properties were designated a National Historic Landmark in 2021, in recognition of its importance in the development of railroad technologies. The graded crossing of the hills between Chester and the New York state line was an engineering challenge on a scale that had not previously been attempted by railroad engineers, and its success proved the ability of railroads to traverse steep grades using just friction. The railroad was also the first inter-regional railroad, connecting the network of eastern New England to that of upstate New York. The Chester Factory depot was an important stopping point for the railroad, where additional engines were added to westbound trains prior to traversing the steeper grades to the west.

The Chester Factory depot is a contributing element of the Chester Factory Village Historic District. The two stone bridges included in the landmark designation, as well as the historic roadbed, are part of the Middlefield–Becket Stone Arch Railroad Bridge District; the bridges are listed as numbers 5 and 6 in that collection.

== See also ==
- Middlefield–Becket Stone Arch Railroad Bridge District
- List of National Historic Landmarks in Massachusetts
- List of bridges documented by the Historic American Engineering Record in Massachusetts
- National Register of Historic Places listings in Berkshire County, Massachusetts
- National Register of Historic Places listings in Hampshire County, Massachusetts
- National Register of Historic Places listings in Hampden County, Massachusetts
