= Middlefield–Becket Stone Arch Railroad Bridge District =

Historic district in Massachusetts, United States

- U.S. National Register of Historic Places
- U.S. Historic district
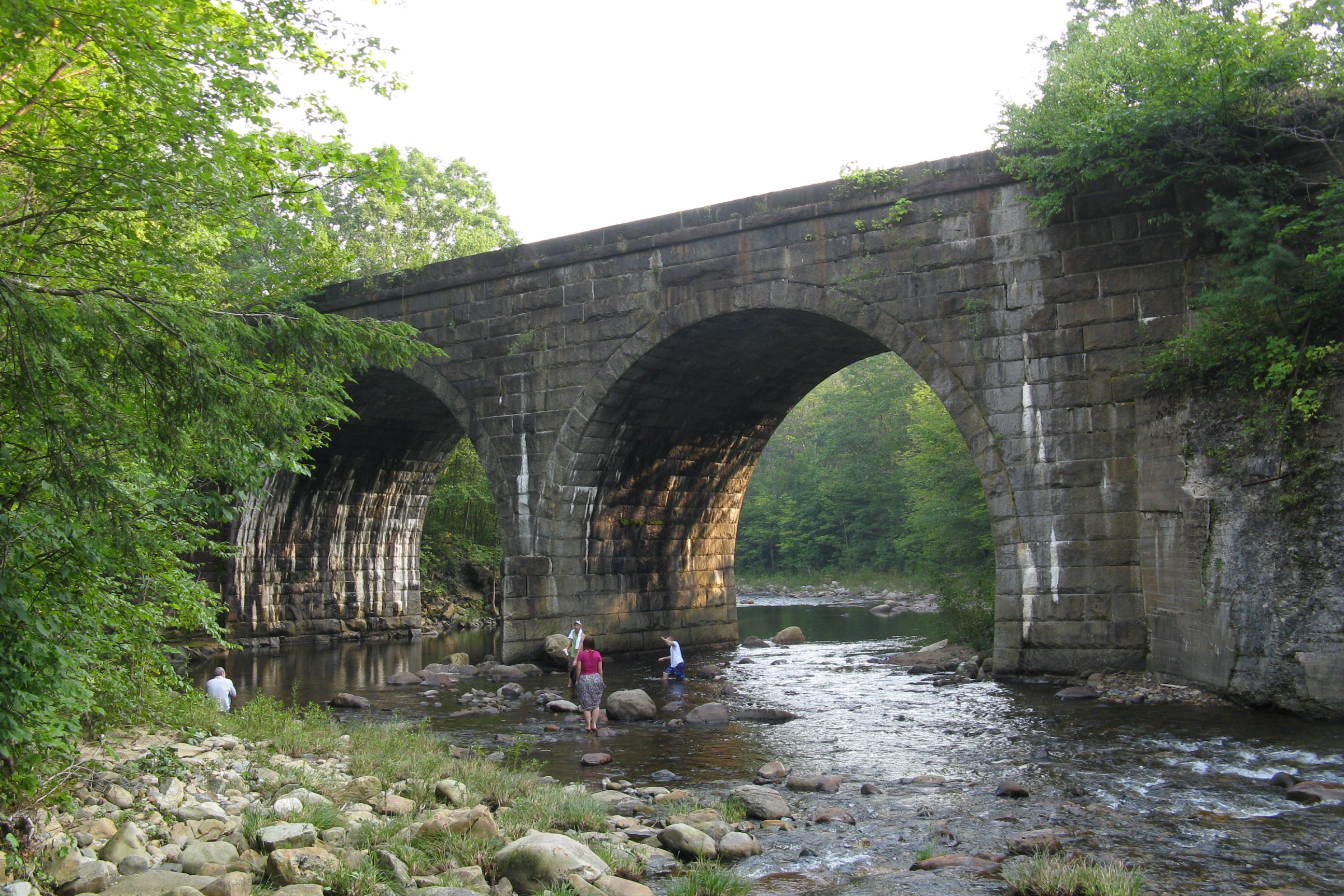
- Near Middlefield Road in Chester

- Location within Massachusetts Location within the United States
- Nearest city: Chester, Massachusetts
- Coordinates: 42°18′45.6″N 72°59′38.3″W
- Built: 1840
- Architect: George Washington Whistler
- NRHP reference No.: 80000502
- Added to NRHP: April 11, 1980

The Middlefield–Becket Stone Arch Railroad Bridge District is a historic district extending through parts of the towns of Chester, Middlefield, and Becket, Massachusetts. The district encompasses a 3.7-mile (6.0 km) stretch of railroad right of way in which there are ten bridge crossings, including nine over the west branch of the Westfield River. The bridges were built in four time periods: 1840, 1866, 1912, and 1928. Nine of the ten bridges are stone or concrete masonry work, and one is a truss girder bridge. All are, with only minor exceptions, in excellent and original condition. The bridges were built to carry the Western Railroad through on its run from the Connecticut River to the Hudson River. This section of railroad was the most expensive the company had to build, costing over $1 million in 1840.

The 1840 bridges were designed by George Washington Whistler, and constructed by the firm of Alexander Birney. Of the original nine stone bridges built, only three survive, all of which are now out of service. Some of the bridges were either demolished or encased in concrete during work performed in 1912 and 1927, and one bridge was demolished in 1927. One of the listed bridges (#4) was built of concrete in 1912, adjacent to one of the 1840 stone bridges (#3) that was taken out of service. The one steel truss bridge was built in 1912 by the Pennsylvania Steel Company. The district was added to the National Register of Historic Places in 1980. A hiking trail providing viewing points to the lower seven bridges was opened in 2004. All of the bridges are viewable via whitewater-appropriate watercraft from the river.

== Bridge list ==
Unless otherwise noted, all bridges were in service at the time of the National Register listing (1980), and crossed the West Branch Westfield River.

| # | CSX Bridge # | Image | Year built | Location | Description |
|---|---|---|---|---|---|
| 1 | 128.21 | | 1866 | 42°18′45.6″N 72°59′38.3″W | Double-span stone arch |
| 2 | 128.44 | | 1912 | 42°18′50.8″N 72°59′52.3″W | Steel deck girder |
| 3 | out of service | | 1840-41 | 42°18′35.8″N 73°00′10.4″W | Stone arch bridge; taken out of service in 1912 |
| 4 | 129.28 | | 1913 | 42°18′35.7″N 73°00′11.4″W | Concrete arch |
| 5 | out of service | | 1840-41 | 42°18′20.3″N 73°00′19.0″W | Stone arch |
| 6 | out of service | | 1840-41 | 42°18′31.8″N 73°00′51.3″W | Stone arch |
| 7 | 130.10 | | 1912 | 42°18′33.2″N 73°01′04.8″W | Concrete arch |
| 8 | 130.46 | | 1866/1912 | 42°18′36.2″N 73°01′29.7″W | Stone/concrete arch; crosses Factory Brook and Town Hill Road |
| 9 | 131.50 | | 1928 | 42°19′05.9″N 73°02′22.7″W | Concrete arch |
| 10 | 131.70 | | 1928 | 42°19′11.6″N 73°02′34.6″W | Concrete arch |

== See also ==
- Western Railroad Stone Arch Bridges and Chester Factory Village Depot
- List of bridges documented by the Historic American Engineering Record in Massachusetts
- National Register of Historic Places listings in Berkshire County, Massachusetts
- National Register of Historic Places listings in Hampshire County, Massachusetts
- National Register of Historic Places listings in Hampden County, Massachusetts
