= Chester station =

Chester station may refer to:

- Chester railway station, a railway station in Chester, England
- Chester Road railway station, a railway station in Birmingham, England
- Chester Northgate railway station, former railway station in Chester, England;
- Chester station (Toronto), a subway station in Toronto, Canada
- Chester Transit Center, an intermodal station in Pennsylvania, United States
- Western Railroad Stone Arch Bridges and Chester Factory Village Depot, a National Historic Landmark District in Massachusetts, United States
