= Chester Center =

Chester Center can refer to:

- Chester Center, Connecticut
- Chester Center Historic District, Massachusetts
