= Timothy Danielson =

Merchant, soldier, and public official from Massachusetts

Timothy Danielson (1733–1791) was the third son of John and Margaret (Mughill) Danielson. He graduated from Yale in 1756. He was a teacher, merchant, soldier, and public official from Massachusetts. During the American Revolution, he served in the Massachusetts Provincial Congress and in 1775, was commissioned colonel of a regiment of the Continental Army.

When the Lexington Alarm was raised in April 1775, he "assembled a regiment of eight companies" consisting of many men from Hampshire County. During this time, his Lt Colonel was William Shepard; the Surgeon was David Shepard. Later, Danielson was chosen Brigadier General for Hampshire County in 1776 and served in New York under General Washington. He was raised to Major General in 1781.

From 1779 to 1789, he served as a member of the Massachusetts Constitutional Convention and was a member of the Massachusetts General Court. Danielson was elected a Fellow of the American Academy of Arts and Sciences in 1781.

According to tradition, he "possessed a Herculean frame, united with Herculean strength."

== Sources ==
- Gardner, MD Frank A. (1909) "Colonel Timothy Danielson's Regiment". Massachusetts Magazine, Vol. II, No. 2, Pg. 72.
- http://founders.archives.gov/documents/Washington/03-01-02-0127
