= North Chester Historic District =

Historic district in Massachusetts, United States

- U.S. National Register of Historic Places
- U.S. Historic district
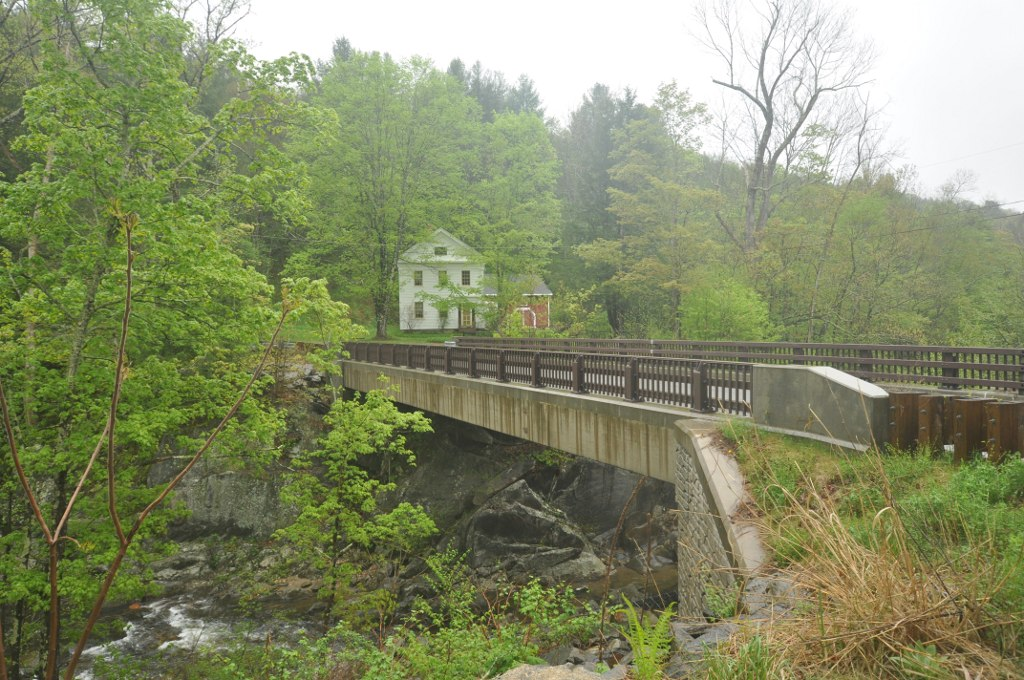
- House and the new Smith Road bridge

- Location within Massachusetts Location within the United States
- Location: Chester, Massachusetts
- Coordinates: 42°19′35″N 72°55′53″W
- Area: 282.5 acres (114.3 ha)
- Architectural style: Colonial Revival, Gothic Revival, Georgian
- NRHP reference No.: 96001465
- Added to NRHP: December 6, 1996

The North Chester Historic District is a historic district encompassing the rural village center of North Chester in the town of Chester, Massachusetts. One of the rural community's early settlement nodes, it thrived into the early 19th century around a stagecoach tavern, a few small mills, and farming, and retains buildings and archaeological remains representative of this history. The district was listed on the National Register of Historic Places in 1998.

== Description and history ==
Most of the properties in the district are strung in a widely spaced rural manner along East River Road, extending from a home and former factory site in the north to a village core with church and cemetery in the south. A few unbuilt parcels of land on Smith and North Chester Roads also contribute to the district, as did the Howe truss iron bridge that carries Smith Road across the middle branch of the Westfield River until its replacement in 2009. In addition to a variety of primarily 19th century residential and agricultural buildings, the district also includes a number of industrial archeological sites, based on the area's history of water-powered mill development.

Chester was settled in the 1760s, with early settlers of the North Chester area including members of the Elder, Smith, and Mann families. One of the most substantial buildings, known as the Cushman Tavern, stands at the junction of East River, North Chester, and Smith Roads; it was built by Thomas Elder about 1773, and served stagecoach travelers on the River Road, which was the preferred route between Springfield and Pittsfield. A short way north of the Smith Road bridge are the remains of a breached dam, where the first sawmill and gristmill stood, built by John Stevens. Later small industry was supported by dams further up and down the river, but these faded in importance after Chester Factory was served by the railroad, and came to dominate the town in industry. Non-residential buildings in the district include a 19th-century schoolhouse and a 1909 chapel.

== See also ==
- National Register of Historic Places listings in Hampden County, Massachusetts
- Chester Center Historic District
- Chester Factory Village Historic District
