= Skåne (disambiguation) =

Skåne or Skane can refer to:

== Places ==
- Skåne, the southernmost of the 25 traditional non-administrative provinces of Sweden, in English usually referred to as Scania
- Skåne County, also called Scania County, in Swedish Skåne län, the southernmost of the 21 administrative counties of Sweden
  - Scania Regional Council, in Swedish Region Skåne, the regional entity responsible for e.g. health care and public transport in Skåne County
- Skane Township, Kittson County, Minnesota, USA
- Skåneland, a historical region of Sweden and Denmark.

== People ==
- Duke of Skåne
- Duchess of Skåne

== Other uses ==
- Skåne Akvavit, a Swedish brand for akvavit
- Skåne University Hospital, in Sweden
- M/S Skåne, a ship operated by Scandlines.

== See also ==
- Skanes (surname)
- Scania (disambiguation)
