= Thomas Shepherd =

Thomas Shepherd may refer to:

- Thomas H. Shepherd (1792–1864), English watercolour artist known for his architectural works
- Tom Shepherd (1889–1957), English cricketer who played for Surrey
- Thomas "Tommy" Shepherd, Marvel Comics character also known as Speed
- Thomas Luther Shepherd (1829–1884), New Zealand politician
- Thomas D. Shepherd (1889–1954), American college football player and coach

== See also ==
- Thomas Shepard (disambiguation)
- Thomas Sheppard (disambiguation)
