= David Shepherd =

David (or Dave) Shepherd, Shepard, or Sheppard may refer to:

== Sportsmen ==
- David Sheppard (1929–2005), England cricket captain and later bishop of Liverpool
- Dave Sheppard (1931–2000), American Olympic weightlifter
- David Shepherd (rugby union) (1936–2003), English rugby union player for Australia
- David Shepherd (umpire) (1940–2009), English cricket umpire
- David Shepherd (sportsman) (born 1956), Australian sportsman who played VFL football with St Kilda and cricket for Victoria
- David Shepard (cricketer) (born 1970), Australian cricketer

== Other people ==
- David Alroy, 12th-century Jewish pseudo-Messiah.
- David Shepard (surgeon) (1744–1818), American doctor and soldier
- David H. Shepard (1923–2007), American inventor
- David Shepherd (producer) (1924–2018), American producer, director, and actor
- David Shepherd (artist) (1931–2017), British artist
- David Shepard (film preservationist) (1940–2017), American film preservationist
- David Shepard (politician) (1947–2021), American politician, Democratic member of the Tennessee House of Representatives
- David Shepherd (Canadian politician) (born 1973 or 1974), Canadian politician, Alberta MLA
- David Sheppard (broadcaster) (born 1981), British radio presenter
- Dave Shepherd (1929–2016), English jazz clarinettist and bandleader

== Fictional characters ==
- David Shepherd, primary protagonist of the 2009 American television series Kings
