= Thomas Shepard =

Thomas Shepard may refer to:

- Thomas Shepard (minister) (1605–1649), American Puritan minister
- Thomas D. Shepard (1925–2012), American politician, Los Angeles City Council member
- Thomas Z. Shepard (born 1936), American record producer
- Tommy Shepard (1923–1993), American trombonist

== See also ==
- Thomas Sheppard (disambiguation)
- Thomas Shepherd (disambiguation)
