= Chester Center Historic District =

Historic district in Massachusetts, United States

- U.S. National Register of Historic Places
- U.S. Historic district
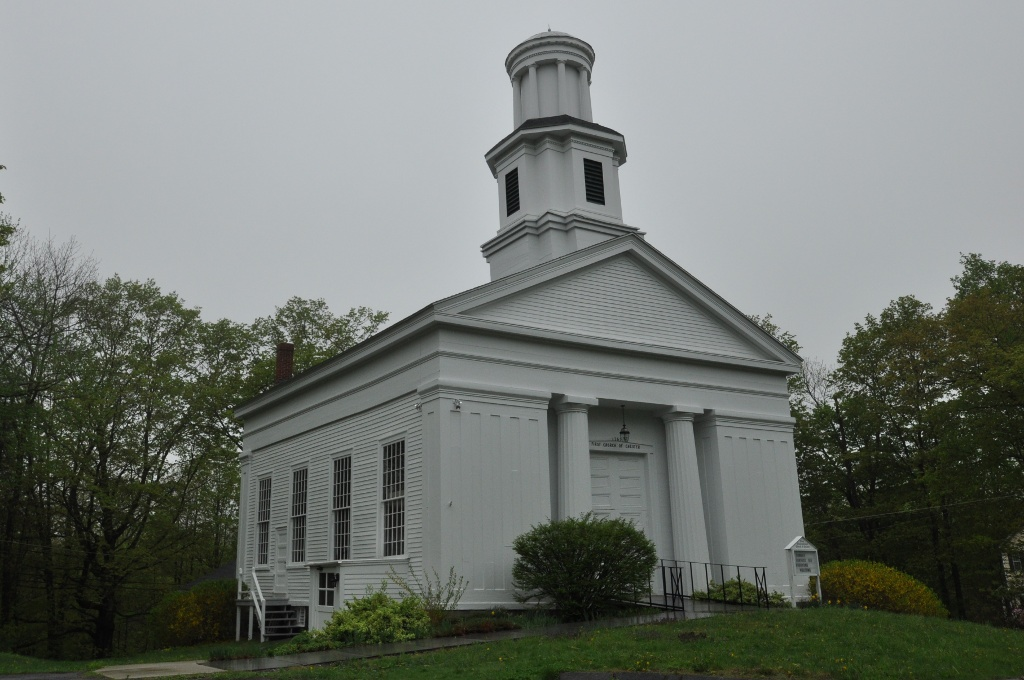
- The Congregational Church in Chester Center

- Location within Massachusetts Location within the United States
- Location: Chester, Massachusetts
- Coordinates: 42°17′26″N 72°55′27″W
- Area: 15 acres (6.1 ha)
- Architect: Henry A. Sykes
- Architectural style: Greek Revival, Colonial, Federal
- NRHP reference No.: 88000161
- Added to NRHP: February 25, 1988

The Chester Center Historic District is a historic district encompassing the historic center of Chester, Massachusetts. The area was first laid out by Chester's first settlers in 1763. It remained the center of commerce and civic life in the rural agricultural community until railroads were built in other areas of the town in the 1840s. The village center declined in importance as economic activity moved to areas more readily accessible to the railroad, and the town hall was eventually moved to Chester Factories. The district includes properties on Skyline Trail near the intersection of Bromley and Lyman Roads, and features Greek Revival, colonial, and Federal architecture. It was listed on the National Register of Historic Places in 1988.

== Description and history ==
Chester Center is located on an upland site on a ridge separating two branches of the Westfield River, along Skyline Trail, a major north-south route through the rural community. The historic elements of the district are three houses, a district schoolhouse, the 1840 First Congregational Church, and the Chester Burying Ground, the latter having a first burial dating to 1769. The Rev. Aaron Bascomb House was also built in 1769, for the town's first settled minister; it is a typical Georgian five-bay house with a large central chimney. The Searles House is a modest 1-1/2 story Cape, built in 1787. The Dr. Anson Boies House was built in 1810 by Reverend Bascomb, whose daughter married the doctor. The district schoolhouse, built in 1798, is one of the oldest in Massachusetts.

The First Congregational Church was designed and built by master builder Henry A. Sykes of Suffield, Connecticut, later an architect of Springfield.

The town of Chester was settled in 1763 and was incorporated in 1765 as Murrayfield. The town's early proprietors set aside the site of the town center as part of its initial land division. Its first meeting house was built sometime thereafter, eventually to be replaced by the Greek Revival First Congregational Church now standing. The town's early economy was largely agricultural. Still, industry developed in the area now known as Chester Factories, which had more ready access to water power, and was nearer an early (1800) turnpike. When the railroad bypassed the center in preference to Chester Factory in 1842, the village center declined in importance, and was not developed further.

== See also ==
- National Register of Historic Places listings in Hampden County, Massachusetts
- North Chester Historic District
