= USS Scania (AKA-40) =

Cargo ship of the United States Navy

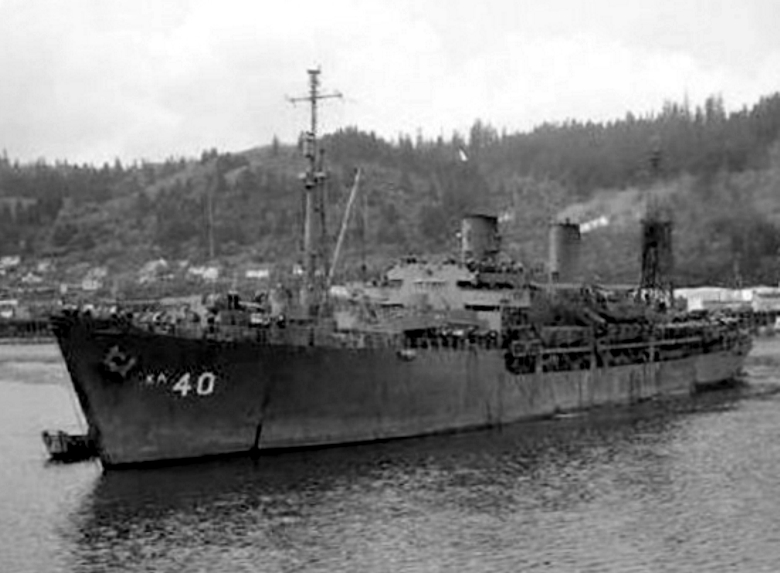

History

United States
- Name: USS Scania
- Namesake: The asteroid Scania
- Builder: Walsh-Kaiser Company, Providence, Rhode Island
- Laid down: 6 January 1945
- Launched: 17 March 1945
- Commissioned: 16 April 1945
- Decommissioned: 2 September 1947
- Stricken: 16 September 1947
- Fate: Scrapped in 1965

General characteristics
- Class & type: Artemis-class attack cargo ship
- Type: S4–SE2–BE1
- Displacement: 4,087 long tons (4,153 t) light; 7,080 long tons (7,194 t) full
- Length: 426 ft (130 m)
- Beam: 58 ft (18 m)
- Draft: 16 ft (4.9 m)
- Speed: 16.9 knots (31.3 km/h; 19.4 mph)
- Complement: 303 officers and enlisted
- Armament: 1 × 5"/38 caliber gun mount; 4 × twin 40 mm gun mounts; 10 × 20 mm gun mounts

USS Scania (AKA-40) was an Artemis-class attack cargo ship in service with the United States Navy from 1945 to 1947. She was scrapped in 1965.

== History ==
Scania (AKA-40) was named after the minor planet 460 Scania, which in turn was named for the southernmost historical province of Sweden. The ship was laid down on 6 January 1945 under Maritime Commission contract (MC hull 1901) by Walsh-Kaiser Co., Inc., Providence, R.I.; launched on 17 March 1945; sponsored by Mrs. Thomas Maguire; and commissioned on 16 April 1945.

After shakedown, Scania departed Norfolk on 31 May 1945 with cargo and passengers for Pearl Harbor, but a turbine casualty required repairs at San Francisco from 16 June to 1 July and delayed her arrival at Pearl until 9 July. On 15 July, she departed Pearl carrying cargo for Tarawa, Majuro, and Kwajalein. After her return to Pearl Harbor on 8 August, she made local cargo voyages in the Hawaiian Islands until sailing on 7 September for Canton Island, Espiritu Santo, Eniwetok, and Wake Island. On arrival at Wake on 11 October, she reported for "Magic Carpet" duties. The ship made two voyages carrying troops home, one from Eniwetok and one from Tacloban, P.I., before being released from "Magic Carpet" duty at Los Angeles at the end of December.

On 17 January 1946, Scania sailed from San Pedro, California, and began a year of duty carrying cargo in the western Pacific. She made four voyages from Guam during this period, calling at Manus, the Philippines, Okinawa, Japan, and China. The ship returned to Seattle on 12 December but soon departed on 21 January 1947 to provide local cargo service in the Aleutians. She returned to Seattle on 2 June and arrived at San Francisco on 14 June for inactivation.

Scania was decommissioned on 2 September 1947 and simultaneously delivered to the Maritime Commission Reserve Fleet at Suisun Bay, California. She was struck from the Navy list on 16 September 1947. The ship was sold by the Maritime Commission on 13 July 1965 to Zidell Explorations, Inc., Portland, Oregon, for scrapping.
