= Duchess of Scania =

Duchess of Scania or Duchess of Skåne may refer to:

- Louise of the Netherlands, Princess Louise, Duchess of Scania (1850–1859) as consort of Prince Carl, later Queen of Sweden and Norway
- Princess Margaret of Connaught, Duchess of Scania (1905–1920) as consort of Prince Gustaf Adolf (later King Gustaf VI Adolf of Sweden)
- Louise Mountbatten, Duchess of Scania (1923–1950) as consort of Prince Gustaf Adolf (later King Gustaf VI Adolf of Sweden), later Queen of Sweden

== See also ==
- Scania (disambiguation)
- Skåne (disambiguation)
