= Chester train wreck =

1893 railroad accident in Massachusetts

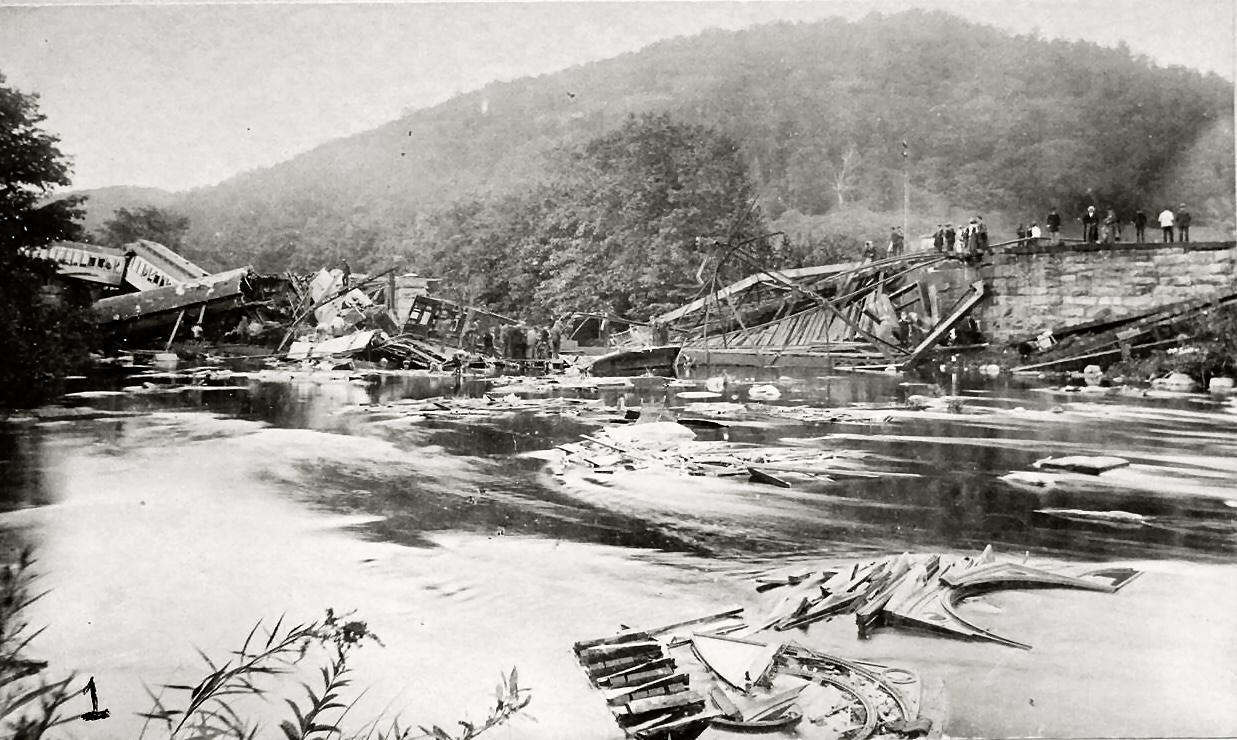
- Aftermath of the incident

Details
- Date: August 31, 1893 (132 years ago); 12:30 pm
- Location: Chester, Massachusetts
- Coordinates: 42.2654°N 72.9623°W
- Country: U.S.
- Operator: Boston and Albany Railroad
- Incident type: Bridge collapse
- Cause: Rivets removed during construction work

Statistics
- Trains: 1
- Passengers: 135
- Crew: 21
- Deaths: 14 (nine passengers and five crew)
- Injured: 30+

The Chester train wreck occurred on August 31, 1893, outside of Chester, Massachusetts. A bridge collapse plunged four train cars into the Westfield River, killing 14 people. An investigation by the Massachusetts Railroad Commission found that the bridge had been weakened by a maintenance crew that had removed rivets from the bridge.

== Bridge ==
The wreck occurred on a 221-foot-long (67 m), two-span iron lattice truss bridge that crossed over the Westfield River. Known as "Willcutt's bridge", it had been built in 1874 and was in the process of being strengthened for larger locomotives. Crews were working that day and were on break at the time of the accident.

== Accident ==
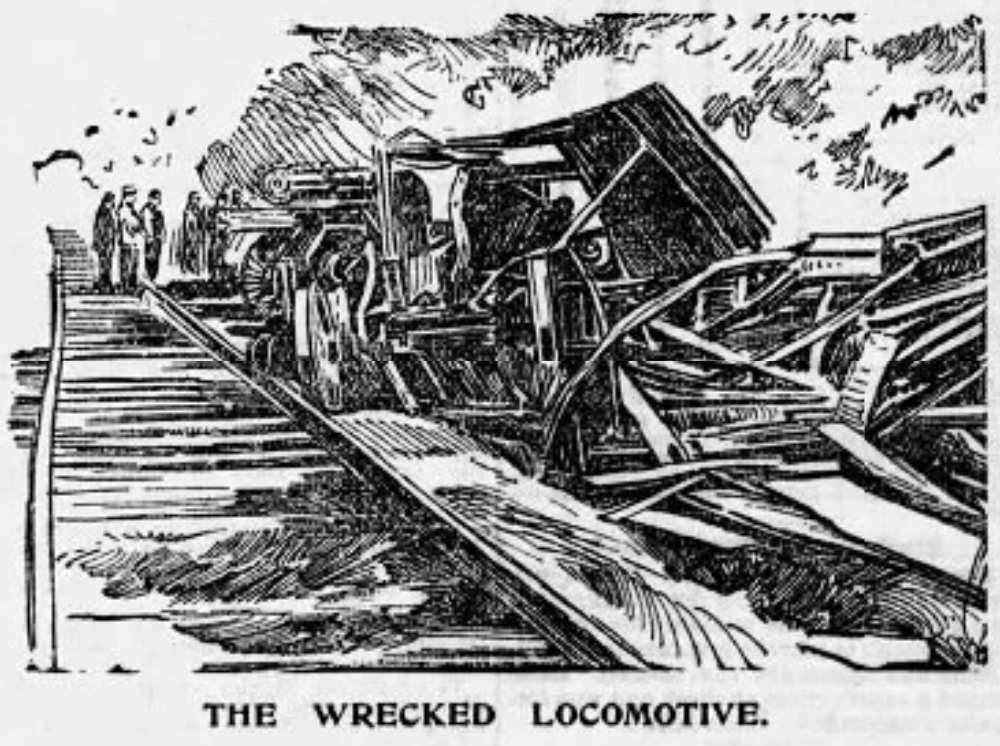
A drawing of the wreck from The Boston Globe

Around 12:30 pm, the bridge collapsed under the weight of the Boston and Albany Railroad’s Chicago limited express (no. 16). The train consistent of a ten-wheel locomotive, its tender, and seven cars, which were ordered (from head to rear) as a buffet car, two sleeping cars, a dining car, two ordinary passenger coaches (or "day coaches"), and a smoking car.

The train's locomotive made it over the bridge, but was smashed. The buffet car, two sleeping cars, and the dining car plunged 20 feet (6.1 m) into the water and shattered upon impact. The two day coaches and the smoking car in the rear of the train remained on the track. Although the accident occurred in a fairly isolated area, a man driving by on horse observed the wreck and rode into the village for help.

Hundreds soon rushed to the scene including a physician, George L. Wood, who treated the injured with the help of the train's porters in a nearby apple orchard. They were then moved to nearby houses before being transported to hospitals in Springfield, Massachusetts, via a two-horse wagon filled with hay and covered in blankets. Thirteen bodies, many of them horribly mutilated, were pulled from the wreck. A 14th victim died three days later.

== Investigation ==
The Massachusetts Railroad Commission launched an inquiry into the accident. The commission heard testimony from four expert witnesses, all of whom testified that the bridge could have held the weight of the train under normal conditions; however, the bridge had been weakened by 50% when the work crew removed the rivets from the connector plate on the top chord of the south truss and neglected to secure it with bolts or drift pins and failed to bolt the new plates in place at the end post. The crew had been in the process of removing rivets when a supervisor called them away to help with another task; the men subsequently went on lunch break prior to the accident. The commission's report noted that at least 150 rivet holes had been left empty, and faulted the railroad company for failing "to provide a competent supervisor or inspector" to ensure the bridge was safe at all times or, if it was not, to prevent a train from crossing it.

An inquest overseen by Judge Homer B. Stevens of the Western Hampden District Court in Westfield, Massachusetts, placed the blame on J. D. Reed and Daniel Belville, the supervisors of the crew working on the bridge. Stevens criticized Reed for not giving Belville specific instructions and Belville, who was not a knowledgeable or qualified bridge builder, for not personally inspecting the work before he and his crew left.

== See also ==
- List of disasters in Massachusetts by death toll
