= Skanes =

Skanes is a surname of Swedish origin. Notable people with the surname include:

- Shepherd Skanes, American football coach
- Walter Skanes (1896–1961), Canadian politician
