= Annisquam Bridge =

Coordinates: 42°39′18″N 70°40′32.4″W

- U.S. National Register of Historic Places
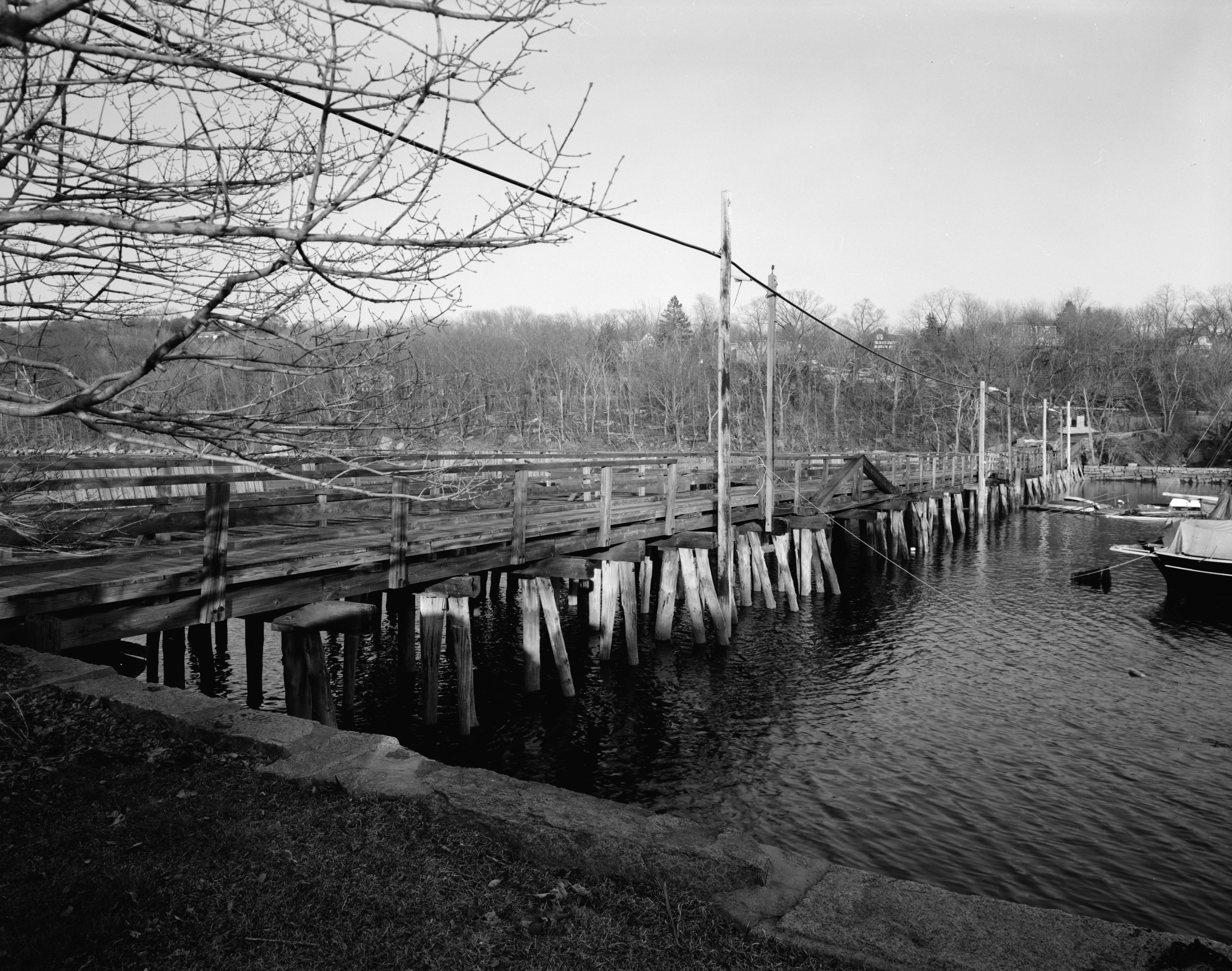
- Annisquam Bridge in 1987

- Location within Massachusetts Location within the United States
- Location: Gloucester, Massachusetts
- Built: 1861
- Architect: Fred T. Hall
- NRHP reference No.: 83000572
- Added to NRHP: June 23, 1983

The Annisquam Bridge is a historic bridge in Annisquam, Massachusetts, a village within the city of Gloucester. The bridge was built in 1861 to replace an earlier 1847 bridge that crossed Lobster Cove. It is a wooden pile bridge, a type of which only two others were found in New England as part of a c. 1979 survey. The bridge is 440 feet (130 m) long and 30 feet (9.1 m) wide, and had a drawbridge section in the center that was moved by a hand-cranked winch. The bridge has repeatedly been the subject of safety closings and restorative work over the course of the 20th century, and was completely rebuilt in 1946–7, removing the draw. Despite this, it was closed to vehicular traffic in 1968, and pedestrian traffic in 1987. The bridge has since been rehabilitated, and is open to pedestrian traffic.

The bridge was listed on the National Register of Historic Places in 1983.

== See also ==
- List of bridges documented by the Historic American Engineering Record in Massachusetts
