= Vietnam Memorial Bridge =

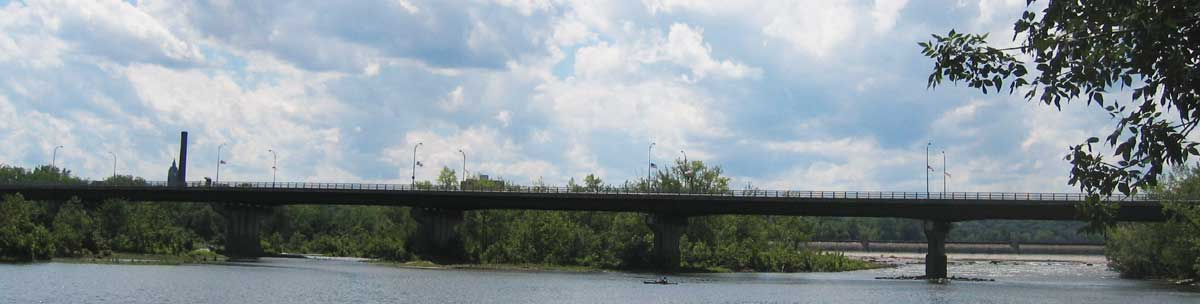
- Coordinates: 42°12′42″N 72°35′46″W
- Carries: pedestrian and vehicular traffic Route 116 (Massachusetts)
- Crosses: Connecticut River
- Locale: South Hadley to Holyoke, Massachusetts

Characteristics
- Design: Girder Bridge

History
- Designer: Unknown current Edward S. Shaw original structure

Location
- Interactive map of Vietnam Memorial Bridge

The Vietnam Memorial Bridge (aka Holyoke Bridge, South Hadley Falls Bridge, and County Bridge) is a girder bridge that spans the Connecticut River between South Hadley and Holyoke, Massachusetts. It was built in 1990 to replace the original Holyoke-South Hadley, the Old County Bridge, which was built in 1889 by New Jersey Steel and Iron Company and was designed by Edward S. Shaw.

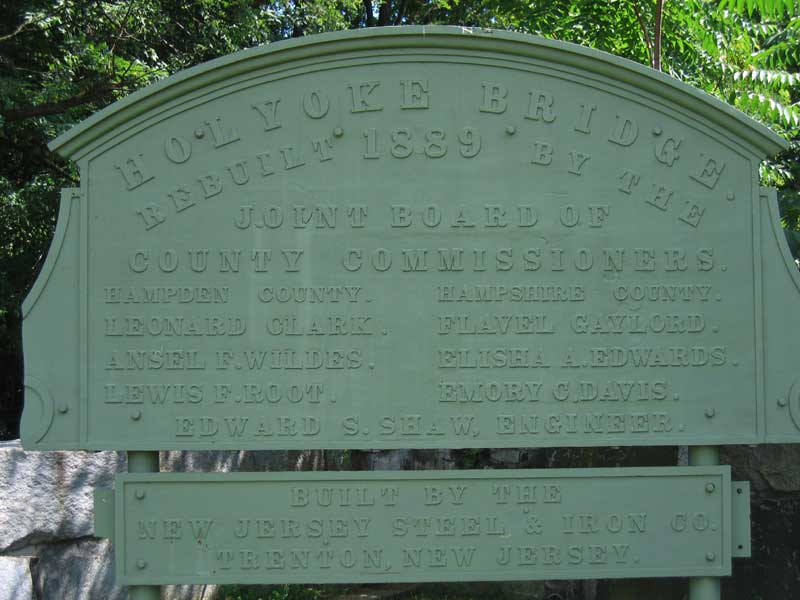
Sign near the current bridge salvaged from its original 1889 counterpart

== See also ==
- List of bridges documented by the Historic American Engineering Record in Massachusetts
- List of crossings of the Connecticut River
