= List of bridges documented by the Historic American Engineering Record in Massachusetts =

This is a list of bridges documented by the Historic American Engineering Record in the U.S. state of Massachusetts.

== Bridges ==
Survey No.	Name (as assigned by HAER)	Status	Type	Built	Documented	Carries	Crosses	Location	County	Coordinates
MA-11	South Canal Bridge	Replaced				South Broadway	South Canal	Lawrence	Essex	42°41′58″N 71°09′52″W
MA-13	Ponakin Road Bridge	Abandoned	Post truss	1871	1979	Ponakin Road	Nashua River	Lancaster	Worcester	42°28′52″N 71°41′07″W
MA-17	Atherton Bridge	Bypassed	Post truss	1870	1979	Bolton Road	Nashua River south branch	Lancaster	Worcester	42°26′41″N 71°40′19″W
MA-18	Holyoke Bridge	Replaced	Lattice truss	1889	1984	Route 116	Connecticut River	Holyoke and South Hadley	Hampden and Hampshire	42°12′42″N 72°35′46″W
MA-22	Boston and Maine Railroad, Charles River Bridges	Extant	Rolling lift (Scherzer) bascule	1931	1984	Boston and Maine Railroad	Charles River	Boston	Suffolk	42°22′08″N 71°03′55″W
MA-27	Boston and Providence Railroad, Canton Viaduct	Extant	Viaduct	1835	1984	Boston and Providence Railroad	Neponset River east branch	Canton	Norfolk	42°09′32″N 71°09′14″W
MA-35	New York, New Haven and Hartford Railroad, Fort Point Channel Rolling Lift Bridge	Replaced	Rolling lift (Scherzer) bascule	1900	1977	New York, New Haven and Hartford Railroad	Fort Point Channel	Boston	Suffolk	42°20′43″N 71°03′30″W
MA-36	Fore River Bridge	Replaced	Rolling lift (Scherzer) bascule	1936	1982	Route 3A	Fore River	Weymouth	Norfolk	42°14′41″N 70°58′02″W
MA-37	Northern Avenue Swing Bridge	Extant	Swing span	1908	1982	Northern Avenue	Fort Point Channel	Boston	Suffolk	42°21′16″N 71°02′58″W
MA-38	Congress Street Bascule Bridge	Extant	Strauss bascule	1930	1982	Congress Street	Fort Point Channel	Boston	Suffolk	42°21′07″N 71°03′04″W
MA-39	Sudbury River Aqueduct, Echo Bridge	Extant	Stone arch	1878	1982	Sudbury Aqueduct	Charles River	Newton Upper Falls	Middlesex	42°18′53″N 71°13′37″W
MA-41	Summer Street Retractile Bridge	Extant	Retractile bridge	1899	1982	Summer Street	Fort Point Channel	Boston	Suffolk	42°21′04″N 71°03′07″W
MA-46	Central Massachusetts Railroad, Linden Street Bridge	Abandoned	Lattice truss	1894	1982	Central Massachusetts Railroad	Route 60 (Linden Street)	Waltham	Middlesex	42°22′49″N 71°13′13″W
MA-47	Longfellow Bridge	Extant	Steel arch	1907	1982	Route 3 (Main Street) and Red Line (MBTA)	Charles River	Boston and Cambridge	Suffolk and Middlesex	42°21′42″N 71°04′31″W
MA-48	Boston and Worcester Railroad, Bogastow Brook Viaduct	Extant	Stone arch	1847	1982	Boston and Worcester Railroad	Bogastow Brook	Holliston	Middlesex	42°12′33″N 71°25′03″W
MA-53	Harvard Bridge	Rehabilitated	Steel built-up girder	1891	1985	Route 2A (Massachusetts Avenue)	Charles River	Boston and Cambridge	Suffolk and Middlesex	42°21′16″N 71°05′29″W
MA-55	Boston and Maine Railroad, Northampton Lattice Truss Bridge	Extant	Lattice truss	1887	1984	Boston and Maine Railroad	Connecticut River	Northampton	Hampshire	42°20′14″N 72°37′07″W
MA-61	Annisquam Bridge	Rehabilitated	Timber stringer	1861	1987	Bridgewater Street	Lobster Cove	Gloucester	Essex	42°39′18″N 70°40′32″W
MA-66	Cape Cod Canal Lift Bridge	Extant	Vertical-lift bridge	1935	1987	Bay Colony Railroad	Cape Cod Canal	Buzzards Bay	Barnstable	41°44′31″N 70°36′49″W
MA-69	Florida Bridge		Lattice truss					Florida	Berkshire	
MA-72	Upper Pacific Mills Bridge	Extant	Bowstring arch truss	1864	1987	Merrimack College pedestrian way	Merrimack College pond	North Andover	Essex	42°40′09″N 71°07′21″W
MA-74	Connecticut River Railroad, Fall River Viaduct	Extant	Stone arch		1987	Connecticut River Railroad	Fall River	Bernardston	Franklin	42°40′05″N 72°32′48″W
MA-76	Boston Public Garden, Suspension Bridge	Extant	Suspension	1867	1987	Pedestrian way	Boston Public Garden lagoon	Boston	Suffolk	42°21′15″N 71°04′12″W
MA-81	Choate Bridge	Extant	Stone arch	1764	1986	Route 1A / Route 133 (South Main Street)	Ipswich River	Ipswich	Essex	42°40′46″N 70°50′14″W
MA-83	Hastings Bridge	Replaced	Queen post truss	1892	1988	Campground Road	Boston and Maine Railroad, Worcester, Nashua and Portland Division	Sterling	Worcester	42°24′19″N 71°44′31″W
MA-84	Saugus River Drawbridge	Rehabilitated	Strauss bascule	1911	1987	Newburyport/Rockport Line (MBTA)	Saugus River	Saugus and Lynn	Essex	42°26′49″N 70°58′20″W
MA-85	Cheney Bridge, Elm Bank Estate	Extant	Steel arch			Cheney Drive	Charles River	Wellesley	Norfolk	42°16′33″N 71°18′34″W
MA-88	Mystic River Drawbridge No. 7	Replaced	Folding	1894	1988	Newburyport/Rockport Line (MBTA)	Mystic River	Somerville and Everett	Middlesex	42°23′35″N 71°04′28″W
MA-92	Powow River Bridge	Extant	Swing span	1891	1990	Main Street	Powwow River	Amesbury	Essex	42°50′29″N 70°55′30″W
MA-93	Essex-Merrimac Bridge	Extant	Suspension	1910	1990	Main Street	Merrimack River	Newburyport and Amesbury	Essex	42°50′01″N 70°54′24″W
MA-94	Boston and Maine Railroad, Clark Street Bridge	Demolished	Howe truss	1908	1990	Clark Street	Boston and Maine Railroad	Belmont	Middlesex	42°23′40″N 71°10′48″W
MA-95	Spring Street Bridge	Extant	Stone arch	1828	1990	Route 109 (Spring Street)	Charles River	Dedham and Suffolk	Norfolk and Suffolk	42°16′15″N 71°10′24″W
MA-96	Shelburne Falls Bridge (Iron Bridge)	Extant	Warren truss	1890	1990	Bridge Street	Deerfield River	Shelburne and Buckland	Franklin	42°36′13″N 72°44′27″W
MA-97	North Chester Village Bridge	Replaced	Pratt truss	1887	1990	Smith Road	Westfield River	Chester	Hampden	42°19′27″N 72°55′39″W
MA-98	Bardwell's Ferry Bridge	Extant	Lenticular truss	1882	1990	Bardwell's Ferry Road	Deerfield River	Shelburne and Conway	Franklin	42°33′20″N 72°40′40″W
MA-99	North Village Bridge	Replaced	Parker truss	1871	1990	North Main Street	French River	Webster and Dudley	Worcester	42°03′54″N 71°52′45″W
MA-100	French King Bridge	Extant	Steel arch	1932	1990	Route 2	Connecticut River	Erving and Gill	Franklin	42°35′52″N 72°29′48″W
MA-101	New Bedford–Fairhaven Middle Bridge	Rehabilitated	Swing span	1899	1990	US 6	Acushnet River	New Bedford	Bristol	41°38′21″N 70°55′04″W
MA-102	Lower Rollstone Street Bridge	Replaced	Parker truss	1870	1990	Rollstone Street	Nashua River	Fitchburg	Worcester	42°35′04″N 71°48′24″W
MA-103	Merrimac Bridge (Rocks Bridge)	Extant	Swing span	1883	1990	Bridge Street	Merrimack River	Haverhill and Newbury	Essex	42°48′38″N 71°00′00″W
MA-104	Duck Bridge	Extant	Warren truss	1888	1990	Union Street	Merrimack River	Lawrence	Essex	42°42′15″N 71°09′12″W
MA-105	Tuttle Bridge	Replaced	Lenticular truss	1885	1990	Golden Hill Road	Housatonic River	Lee	Berkshire	42°19′19″N 73°14′32″W
MA-106	Aiken Street Bridge	Extant	Lenticular truss	1883	1990	Aiken Street	Merrimack River	Lowell	Middlesex	42°39′17″N 71°18′55″W
MA-107	Eleventh Street Bridge	Extant	Warren truss	1915	1990	Eleventh Street	Turners Falls Canal	Montague	Franklin	42°36′09″N 72°33′52″W
MA-108	Boston and Albany Railroad, Marion Street Bridge	Replaced	Warren truss	1896	1990	Marion Street	Boston and Albany Railroad	Natick	Middlesex	42°17′14″N 71°20′16″W
MA-109	Blackinton Bridge	Demolished	Lenticular truss	1884	1990	Galvin Road	Hoosic River	North Adams	Berkshire	42°42′14″N 73°10′23″W
MA-110	Bay State Bridge	Extant	Pratt truss	1894	1990	Clement Street	Mill River	Northampton	Hampshire	42°19′9″N 72°39′55″W
MA-111	Schell Memorial Bridge	Abandoned	Pennsylvania truss	1903	1990	East Northfield Road	Connecticut River	Northfield	Franklin	42°42′44″N 72°27′12″W
MA-112	Bartlett's Bridge	Extant	Stone arch	1889	1990	Clara Barton Road	French River	Oxford	Worcester	42°09′17″N 71°52′57″W
MA-113	Woronoco Bridge	Extant	Reinforced concrete open-spandrel arch	1923	1990	Bridge Street	Westfield River	Russell	Hampden	42°09′50″N 72°49′38″W
MA-114	Hampden County Memorial Bridge	Extant	Reinforced concrete closed-spandrel arch	1922	1990	Route 147 (Memorial Drive)	Connecticut River	Springfield and West Springfield	Hampden	42°05′56″N 72°35′42″W
MA-115	Butler Bridge (Lester Bridge)	Extant	Pratt truss	1882	1990	Butler Road	Housatonic River	Stockbridge	Berkshire	42°17′13″N 73°19′57″W
MA-116	Boston and Maine Railroad, Essex Street Bridge	Replaced	Howe truss	1901	1990	Essex Street	Boston and Maine Corporation	Swampscott	Essex	42°28′47″N 70°54′58″W
MA-117	Boston and Albany Railroad, Kingsbury Street Bridge	Extant	Warren truss	1889	1990	Kingsbury Street	Boston and Albany Railroad	Wellesley	Norfolk	42°18′09″N 71°17′13″W
MA-118	Boston and Albany Railroad, Weston Road Bridge	Replaced	Warren truss	1888	1990	Weston Road	Boston and Albany Railroad	Wellesley	Norfolk	42°17′47″N 71°17′58″W
MA-119	Coleman Bridge	Bypassed	Queen post truss	1894	1990	Windsor Bush Road	Phelps Brook	Windsor	Berkshire	42°31′56″N 72°59′36″W
MA-123	Massachusetts Historic Bridges							Boston	Suffolk	
MA-129	Broadway Bridge	Demolished	Swing span	1875	1992	Broadway	Fort Point Channel	Boston	Suffolk	42°20′40″N 71°03′35″W
MA-131	Adams Street Bridge	Replaced	Stone arch	1847	1996	Adams Street	Neponset River	Boston	Suffolk	42°16′16″N 71°04′05″W
MA-132	Cooper Street Bridge	Replaced	Reinforced concrete closed-spandrel arch	1903	1995	Cooper Street	Haverhill Line (MBTA)	Wakefield	Middlesex	42°28′40″N 71°03′56″W
MA-133	Lovett Bridge	Replaced	Steel built-up girder	1908	1994	Cook Street	Mumford River	Douglas	Worcester	42°04′27″N 71°42′45″W
MA-135	Summer Street Bridge	Replaced	Retractile bridge	1892	1996	Summer Street	Reserved Channel	Boston	Suffolk	42°20′33″N 71°02′11″W
MA-136	Field Street Bridge	Replaced	Warren truss	1894	1996	Field Street	Old Colony Railroad	Brockton	Plymouth	42°06′18″N 71°01′15″W
MA-137	Fordway Bridge	Replaced	Reinforced concrete T-beam	1912	1996	Pollard Street	Concord River	Billerica	Middlesex	42°35′06″N 71°17′14″W
MA-140	Chelsea Street Bridge and Draw Tender's House	Replaced	Strauss bascule	1937	1997	Chelsea Street	Chelsea River	Boston	Suffolk	42°23′11″N 71°01′22″W
MA-141	Tremont Station Bridge	Extant	Pratt truss	1878	1996	Pierceville Road	Fairhaven Branch Railroad	Wareham	Plymouth	41°47′28″N 70°46′11″W
MA-142	Northwest Road Bridge	Replaced	Lenticular truss	1887	1996	Northwest Road	Little River	Westfield	Hampden	42°07′50″N 72°49′21″W
MA-143	Fifth Street Bridge	Replaced	Reinforced concrete open-spandrel arch	1913	1997	Fifth Street	North Nashua River	Fitchburg	Worcester	42°34′32″N 71°47′16″W
MA-154	Whistler Bridge No. 3	Extant	Stone arch	1841	2006	Western Railroad	Westfield River west branch	Becket	Berkshire	42°18′36″N 73°00′11″W
MA-155	Whistler Bridge No. 4	Extant	Stone arch	1841	2006	Western Railroad	Westfield River west branch	Becket	Berkshire	42°18′20″N 73°00′19″W
MA-156	Whistler Bridge No. 5	Extant	Stone arch	1841	2006	Western Railroad	Westfield River west branch	Becket	Berkshire	42°18′32″N 73°00′51″W
MA-157	Whistler Bridge No. 6	Extant	Reinforced concrete closed-spandrel arch	1912	2006	Western Railroad	Westfield River west branch	Becket	Berkshire	42°18′33″N 73°01′05″W
MA-158	Double Arch Bridge	Extant	Stone arch	1866	2006	Western Railroad	Westfield River west branch	Chester	Hampden	42°18′46″N 72°59′38″W
MA-161	Bancroft Bridge	Extant	Stone arch	1866	2006	Western Railroad	Factory Brook and Town Hill Road	Middlefield	Hampshire	42°18′36″N 73°01′30″W
