= Thomas Sheppard =

Thomas or Tommy Sheppard may refer to:

- Thomas Sheppard (cricketer) (1873–1954), English cricketer
- Thomas Sheppard (MP) (1766–1858), Whig (and then Conservative) Member of Parliament (MP) for Frome
- Sir Thomas Sheppard, 1st Baronet (died 1821), of the Cotton-Sheppard baronets
- Sir Thomas Cotton-Sheppard, 2nd Baronet (1785–1848), of the Cotton-Sheppard baronets
- Thomas Sheppard (curator) (1876–1945), museum founder and curator in Kingston upon Hull, UK
- Tommy Sheppard (politician), Scottish politician
- Tommy Sheppard (basketball), American sports executive

== See also ==
- Thomas Shepard (disambiguation)
- Thomas Shepherd (disambiguation)
- Sheppard (surname)
