= General Shepherd =

General Shepherd or General Shephard may refer to:

- Gordon Strachey Shephard (1885–1918), British Royal Flying Corps brigadier general
- Leland C. Shepard Jr. (1923–2009), U.S. Air Force brigadier general
- Lemuel C. Shepherd Jr. (1896–1990), U.S. Marine Corps four-star general
- William Shepard (1737–1817), Continental Army general
- Lieutenant General Shepherd, fictional character in the Call of Duty video game franchise

== See also ==
- Isaac F. Shepard (1816–1899), Union Army brigadier general-appointee not confirmed to that rank
- Rear Admiral Alan Shepard, American astronaut
- Donald Shepperd (born 1940), U.S. Air Force major general
- Shepherd (name), including Shephard
