= Chester (CDP), Massachusetts =

Chester, Massachusetts
- Census-designated place
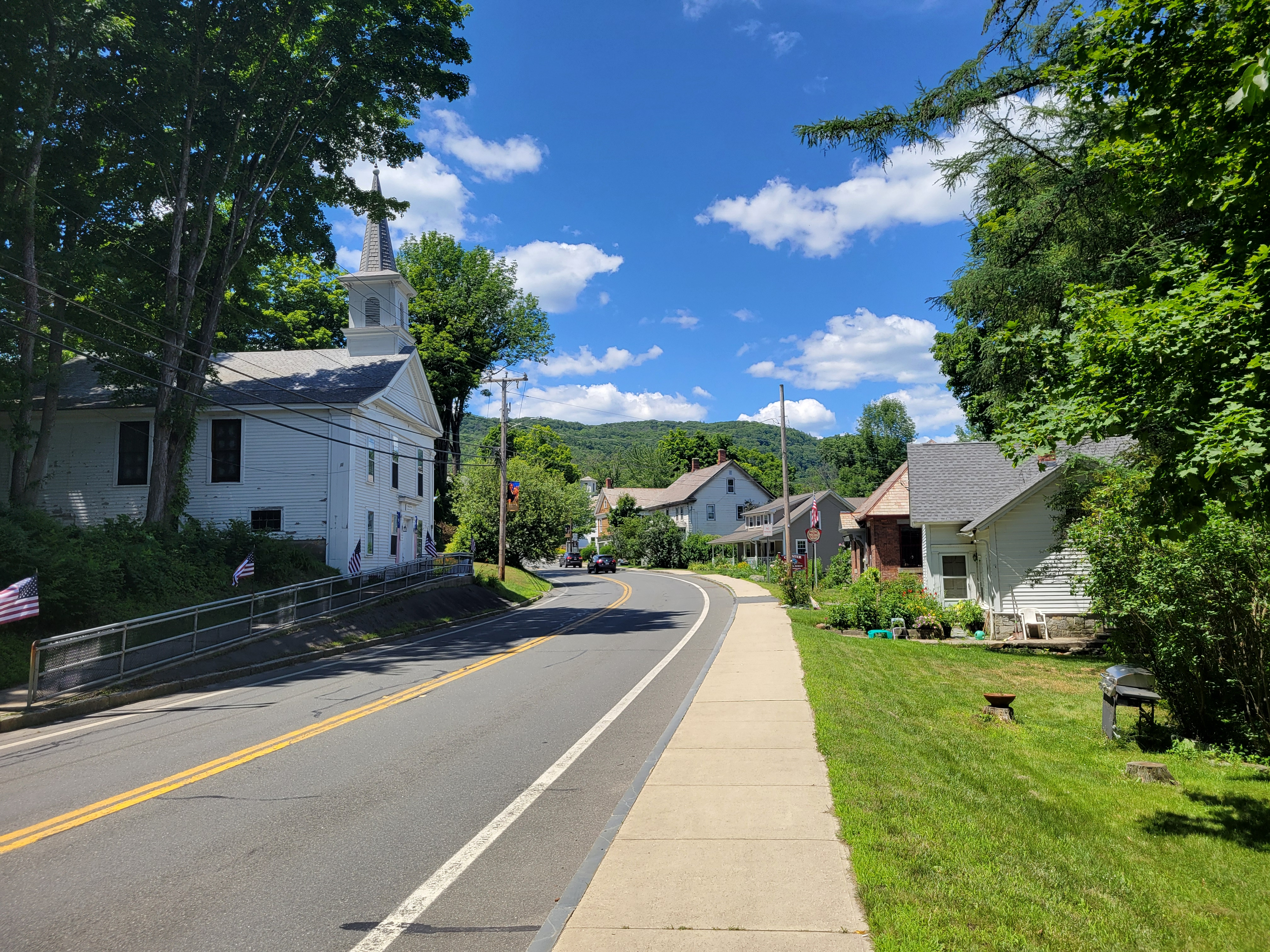
- U.S. Route 20 in Chester

- Location in Hampden County in Massachusetts
- Coordinates: 42°16′45″N 72°58′43″W
- Country: United States
- State: Massachusetts
- County: Hampden
- Town: Chester

Area
  - Total: 1.43 sq mi (3.70 km^{2})
  - Land: 1.39 sq mi (3.61 km^{2})
  - Water: 0.031 sq mi (0.08 km^{2})
- Elevation: 601 ft (183.3 m)

Population (2020)
  - Total: 552
  - Density: 395.8/sq mi (152.81/km^{2})
- Time zone: UTC-5 (Eastern (EST))
  - Summer (DST): UTC-4 (EDT)
- ZIP code: 01011
- Area code: 413
- FIPS code: 25-13450
- GNIS feature ID: 0608286

Chester is a census-designated place that comprises the populated center of the town of Chester in Hampden County, Massachusetts, United States. The population of the CDP was 627 at the 2010 census, out of 1,337 in the entire town of Chester. It is part of the Springfield, Massachusetts Metropolitan Statistical Area.

== Geography ==
The Chester CDP is in the western part of the town of Chester, along U.S. Route 20 (Main Street) in the valley of the West Branch of the Westfield River where it is joined by Walker Brook. US 20 leads southeast down the Westfield River valley 18 miles (29 km) to Westfield and 29 miles (47 km) to Springfield, while to the west, US 20 turns up the Walker Brook valley and leads across the height of land of the Berkshires 17 miles (27 km) to Lee.

According to the United States Census Bureau, the Chester CDP has a total area of 1.4 square miles (3.7 km^{2}), of which 0.03 square miles (0.08 km^{2}), or 2.27%, are water.

== Demographics ==
Historical population
Census	Pop.	Note	%±
2020	552		—
U.S. Decennial Census
