= Chester Factory Village Historic District =

Historic district in Massachusetts, United States

- U.S. National Register of Historic Places
- U.S. Historic district
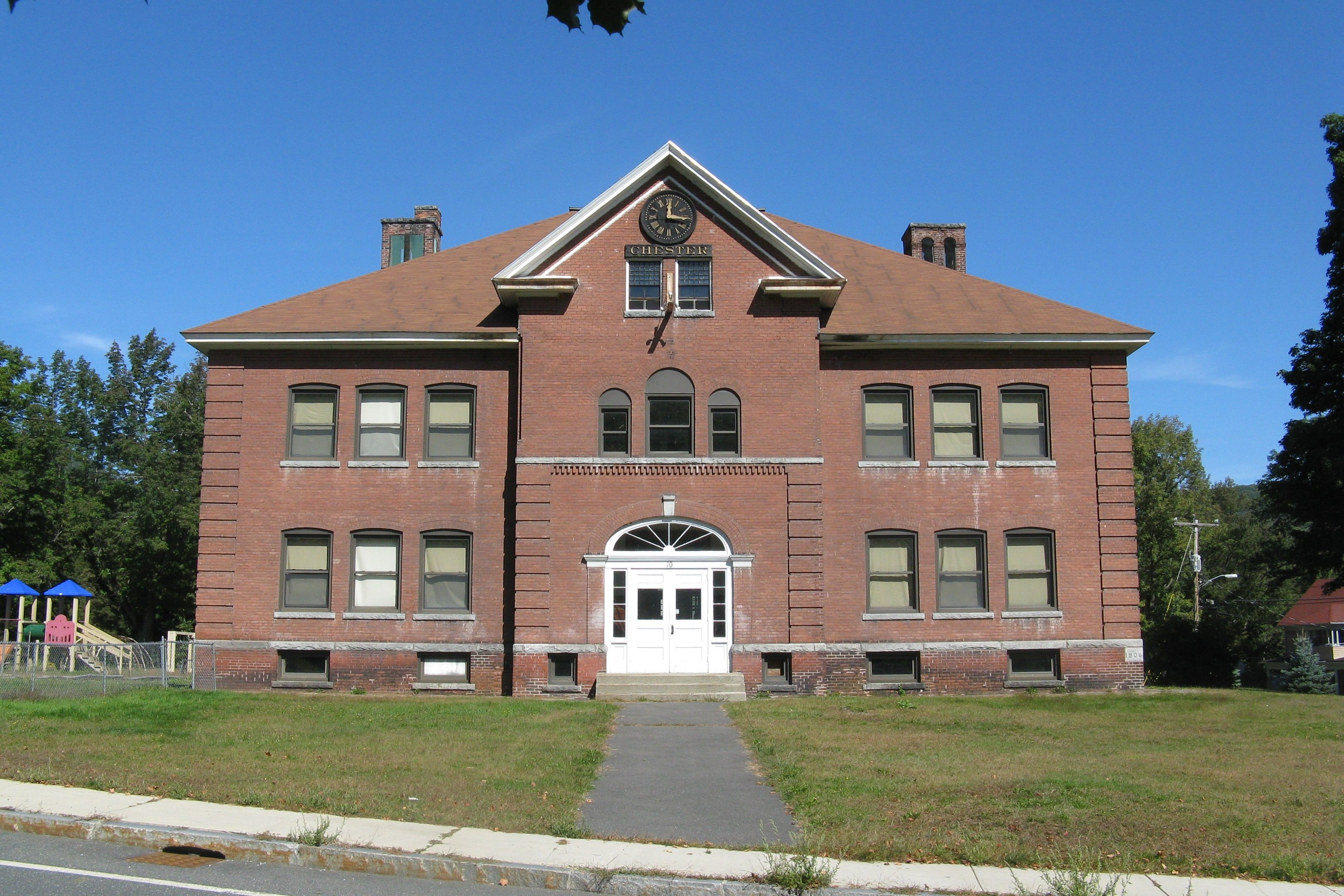
- Chester Elementary School

- Location within Massachusetts Location within the United States
- Location: Chester, Massachusetts
- Coordinates: 42°16′52″N 72°58′54″W
- Area: 140 acres (57 ha)
- Architectural style: Mid 19th Century Revival, Early Republic, Late Victorian
- NRHP reference No.: 89000145
- Added to NRHP: March 16, 1989

The Chester Factory Village Historic District is a historic district encompassing the historic village of Chester Factories in Chester, Massachusetts. Chester was settled in the 1760s, and the factory village was a location where water power was harnessed at an early time for grist mills and sawmills. The village got its name from the Chester Glass Factory, which operated in the area through the War of 1812. It benefited from the construction of a turnpike (now United States Route 20) leading to Chester Center in 1804, and was transformed by the arrival of the railroad around 1840. The village became an important provisioning stop for trains, and the village further benefited by the fact that the railroad bypassed Chester Center. The economic and civic life of the town gradually shifted, and Chester Factories is where the town hall and library were built. It was added to the National Register of Historic Places in 1989.

The district is roughly bounded by Middlefield Road, River, Main, and Maple Streets, US 20, and Williams Street. The southern boundary is roughly US 20, with the tracks formerly of the Western Railroad the boundary to the northeast. There are some older houses in the area along US 20, while more intensive industrial development took place along the Westfield River branch which runs between the two transportation routes. The village's greatest period of growth was between 1879 and 1915, when the production of abrasive materials, and granite quarrying and cutting operations became major industries. The Fay's Clothing Store, built in 1896, is at three stories the village's tallest building.

== See also ==
- National Register of Historic Places listings in Hampden County, Massachusetts
- North Chester Historic District
