= Leo Shepherd =

American jazz musician

Leo "The Whistler" Shepherd was a jazz trumpet player in the big band era. He came to prominence playing in Lionel Hampton's big band in 1946.

Shepard was born in 1926 in Charleston, South Carolina. In 1932, he was raised in an orphanage called Jenkins Orphanage.

In his career Leo Shepherd pushed the commonly accepted range of the trumpet to new heights. He is noted for his ability to play in the extreme upper range of the trumpet (triple C's and above) with amazing power. He was an early influence on many high note trumpeters, including Canadian trumpeter Maynard Ferguson, who has mentioned Shepherd in interviews. He got his nickname from being able to play 5 octaves on the trumpet into the highest register. Shepherd made approximately 40 recordings between the years of 1946 and 1951. He recorded with such musicians as Lionel Hampton, Quincy Jones, Wes Montgomery, Jimmy Scott, Fats Navarro, Bing Crosby, and Charles Mingus.
