= Gordon Shepherd =

Gordon Shepherd may refer to:

- Gordon Shepherd (football chairman) (born 1935), current chairman of Barnsley F.C.
- Gordon G. Shepherd, Canadian space scientist
- Gordon M. Shepherd (1933–2022), American neuroscientist
- Gordon W. Shepherd, American attorney and politician in Virginia

== See also ==
- Gordon Strachey Shephard (1885–1918), British Royal Flying Corps commander and sailor
