= David Shepard (surgeon) =

American surgeon and politician

Massachusetts House of Representatives
- In office 1780–Unknown

Town Clerk Chester, Massachusetts
- In office 1771–1774
- In office 1777–1798

Selectman Chester, Massachusetts
- In office 1772–1776
- In office 1790–1791
- In office 1795–1795
- In office 1797–1798

Personal details
- Born: October 23, 1744 Westfield, Massachusetts
- Died: December 12, 1818 Amsterdam, New York
- Education: Yale

Military service
- Allegiance: United Colonies; United States
- Branch/service: Massachusetts Bay provincial militia, Continental Army
- Years of service: Militia: 1775; Continental Army: 1775–1777
- Rank: Captain
- Battles/wars: American Revolutionary War • Battles of Lexington and Concord • Siege of Boston • Battle of Bennington

David Shepard (October 23, 1744 – December 12, 1818) was an American doctor, a member of the Massachusetts House of Representatives, a Minuteman, and surgeon in the Continental Army. He was an early proponent of inoculation to prevent smallpox.

Shepard was present at several key battles of the American Revolution, usually acting in a medical capacity, as a military surgeon.

== Biography ==
=== Early life (1744–1761) ===
David Shepard was born in Westfield, Massachusetts, to John and Elizabeth (Noble) Shepard, their eighth child of nine.

=== Yale college (1762–1769) ===
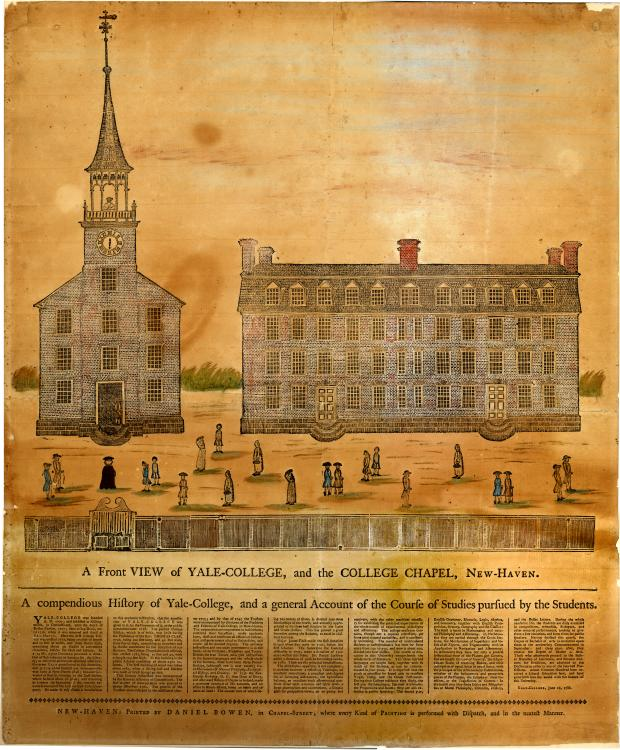
A Front View of Yale-College, and the College Chapel, 1786. Yale students near the college President are seen removing their hats, a Yale custom of the era. The College Chapel (left), was a recent addition to Yale College when David Shepard arrived in about 1764, having just been completed the year before.

Shepard attended Yale at a time when the student body was caught up in the rebellious spirit of the 1760s. The students stopped going to classes and prayers and generally abused the tutors, who resigned. They would frequently speak against the British Parliament in chapel, and petitioned the Corporation with their grievances, insisting on the removal of the disciplinarian president Thomas Clap. Things at the college had become so difficult the Corporation ordered an early spring vacation, and David Shepard was one of the few undergraduates that returned. Despite the reduced student body, things continued this way until the end of the term.

Commencements were usually celebrated with copious amounts of alcohol, despite the students resolving to drink no "foreign spiritous Liquors any more." (Note: A letter from Roswell Grant (Yale 1765) to his father, Capt. Ebenezer Grant, in Stiles, History, p311.) The diary of one of Shepard's classmates (Note: Joseph B. Wadsworth (Yale 1766)) records on September 9, 1766—the day before commencement—that they were examined for their degrees in the afternoon, but only after getting "Liquer (sic) in readiness for Commencement."

Shepard graduated (B.A.) that September at what would be Yale president Thomas Clap's last commencement before resigning, Friday, September 10, 1766. The next year David married Margaret Clap, daughter of Ezra Clap (Yale, 1740) on December 3, 1767.

In 1769 David is included in a list of Master's degree candidates, his thesis relating to the nature of slow versus acute disease. (Note: David Shepard is listed as arguing for the affirmative, to the question, "An morbi Lenti, quàm Acutiores, magis sint periculosi?" in Yale College, Quæstiones.) This is the same year that his wife died, leaving him with one daughter, also named Margaret.

=== Murrayfield, Mass. (1770–1774) ===
He removed to Murrayfield, Massachusetts (now called Chester) and married a second time to Lucinda Mather on January 7, 1773. They had six children: Mather, David, Lucinda, Harriet, Fanny and Horace.

David Shepard was a Selectman of Murrayfield, serving throughout 1772–76, and for several years through the 1790s.

=== American Revolution (1775–1783) ===
As Boston's conflict with the royal government came to a head in 1773–75, Shepard was appointed to the Chester Committee of Correspondence. And at the battles of Lexington and Concord, April 19, 1775, he would serve as a volunteer surgeon. Following the Lexington Alarm, Shepard went to Cambridge as captain of a company of Minutemen in the regiment commanded by Col. Seth Pomeroy. On arrival, April 28, 1775, he was appointed Surgeon of Danielson's Regiment (Note: David Shepard served in Danielson's regiment along with two of his elder brothers: John, serving as Lieutenant in Capt. Parks' company, and William, serving as Lt. Col. of the regiment, and who would later play an important role in Shays' Rebellion) and remained at the fortifications in Roxbury, Mass. in that capacity through the remainder of that year. He served in the Battle of Bunker Hill. He later served with a detachment of the Third Hampshire County Regiment which marched to Ticonderoga to reinforce the army by order of General Schuyler, and was present at the Battle of Bennington, August 16, 1777.

=== United States Constitution ===
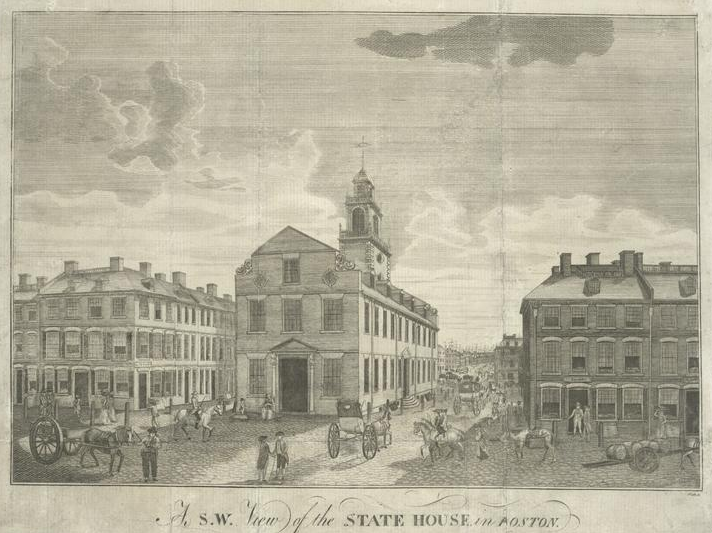
Delegates proceeded to the Statehouse following their deliberations on the Constitution, depicted here (1793) much as it would have looked at the time.

At a town meeting on December 13, 1787, Shepard was chosen as Chester's delegate to the State Convention to meet at Boston in January.

And, in January 1788, Shepard was recorded at Boston, Massachusetts where he served as representative of the town of Chester at a Constitutional Convention to consider a constitution reported in the summer of 1787 by the Constitutional Convention in Philadelphia. On February 6 they formally ratified the U.S. Constitution, proceeding to the Boston State House for a reception.

Shepard was reimbursed for his time and travel to a total of £14.14.0.

=== Amsterdam, N.Y. (1802–1818) ===
In 1802 Shepard purchased a farm near Amsterdam, N.Y., and resided there until his death. This farm later became the Fairview Cemetery (Amsterdam, New York).

== Bibliography ==
- Balltentine, George H., ed. (2002). Rev. John Ballantine, Minister of Westfield, Massachusetts, Journal, 1737-1774. Heritage Books.
- Clap, Thomas (1766). The Annals or History of Yale-College, 1700 to 1766. New Haven, Conn.: John Hotchkiss & B. Mecom.
- Copeland, Alfred M. (1892). A History of the Town of Murrayfield: Earlier Known as Township No. 9, and Comprising the Present Towns of Chester and Huntington, the Northern Part of Montgomery, and the Southeast Corner of Middlefield. C.W. Bryan & Company, Printers.
- Copeland, Alfred M. (1902). Our County and Its People: A History of Hampden County, Massachusetts. Century Memorial Pub. Co.
- Dexter, Franklin Bowditch (1903). Biographical Sketches of the Graduates of Yale College with Annals of the College History, Volume 3. New York: Henry Holt and Co.
- Everts, Louis H. (1879). History of the Connecticut Valley in Massachusetts with Illustrations and Biographical Sketches of Some of its Prominent Men and Pioneers, Volume 2. Philadelphia: J. B. Lippincott & Co.
- Gardner, Frank A. (1909). "Colonel Timothy Danielson's regiment". The Massachusetts Magazine: Devoted to Massachusetts History, Genealogy, Biography. Vol. 2. Salem, MA: Salem Press. p. 71,75.
- Massachusetts, Office of the Secretary of State. (1906) Massachusetts soldiers and sailors of the revolutionary war. A compilation from the archives prepared and published by the secretary of the commonwealth in accordance with chapter 100, resolves of 1891. Boston: Wright and Potter Printing Co., State Printers.
- "Representatives". Continental journal, and weekly advertiser. Boston. November 2, 1780.
- Stiles, Henry Reed (1892). The History and Genealogies of Ancient Windsor, Connecticut, Volume 2. Hartford, Conn.: Case, Lockwood & Brainard Co.
- Stokes, Anson Phelps (1914). Memorials of Eminent Yale Men: A Biographical Study of Student Life and University Influences During the Eighteenth and Nineteenth Centuries. Yale University Press. p. 118.
- Yale College. Quæstiones pro modula discutiendæ sub reverendo D. Naphtali Daggett, Collegii-Yalensis, Quod est, Divina Providentia, Novo-Portu Connecticutensium, Præside, In Comitiis Publicis a Laureae Magistralis Candidatis, M, DCC, LXIX. Thomas & Samuel Green, Printers, 1769.
