= Shepherd Skanes =

American football coach

Biographical details
- Born: Birmingham, Alabama, U.S.
- Died: February 2, 2026; Birmingham, Alabama, U.S.

Coaching career (HC unless noted)
- ?–2003: Carver HS (AL) (OC)
- 2004: Concordia (AL) (OC)
- 2005–2012: Concordia (AL)
- 2013–2015: Morehouse (DL)
- 2016–2020: Lane (OC/QB)
- 2021: Miles (TE)
- 2022–2025: Fairfield Prep (AL)

Head coaching record
- Overall: 33–40 (college); 19–26 (high school)

Shepherd Skanes was an American college football coach. He was the head football coach for Fairfield College Preparatory School, a position he held from 2022 until his death in 2026. At Fairfield Prep, Skanes held a 19–26 record. Skanes was the head coach at Concordia–Selma from 2005 to 2012 where he compiled an overall record of 33–40. He previously coached for Morehouse, Lane, and Miles.

== Coaching career ==
Skanes served as the first head football coach for the Concordia Hornets located in Selma, Alabama (sometimes called "Concordia–Alabama") and held that position from when the program began in 2005 through the third game of their 2012 season. His coaching record at Concordia was 33 wins and 40 losses. As coach, Skanes gained respect of other regional coaches for his ability to work and build a program with comparatively less resources than his peers.

== Head coaching record ==
=== College ===
Year	Team	Overall	Conference	Standing	Bowl/playoffs
Concordia Hornets (NAIA independent) (2005)
2005	Concordia	6–4			
Concordia Hornets (South East Atlantic Conference) (2006–2008)
2006	Concordia	2–8			
2007	Concordia	2–9			
2008	Concordia	5–6			
Concordia Hornets (NAIA independent) (2009–2012)
2009	Concordia	5–5			
2010	Concordia	4–4			
2011	Concordia	5–4			
2012	Concordia	2–1			
Concordia:		33–40			
Total:		33–40			

=== High school ===
Year	Team	Overall	Conference	Standing	Bowl/playoffs
Fairfield Prep Tigers () (2022–present)
2022	Fairfield Prep	3–8	3–4	4th	
2023	Fairfield Prep	4–7	4–3	4th	
2024	Fairfield Prep	0–0	0–0		
Fairfield Prep:		7–15	7–7		
Total:		7–15			
