= 460 Scania =

Main-belt asteroid

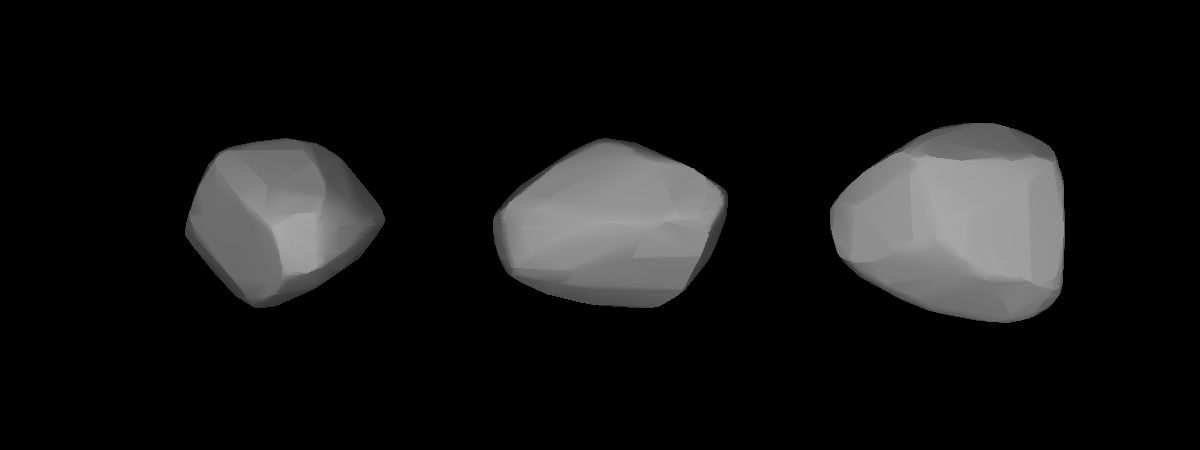
- Lightcurve-base 3D-model of 460 Scania.

Discovery
- Discovered by: M. F. Wolf
- Discovery site: Heidelberg Obs.
- Discovery date: 22 October 1900

Designations
- Pronunciation: /ˈskeɪiə/
- Named after: Scania (Skåne) (Province of Sweden)
- Alternative designations: A900 UF · 1900 FN
- Minor planet category: main-belt · (middle); background · slow

Orbital characteristics
- Epoch 31 May 2020 (JD 2459000.5)
- Uncertainty parameter 0
- Observation arc: 119.27 yr (43,564 d)
- Aphelion: 3.0059 AU
- Perihelion: 2.4304 AU
- Semi-major axis: 2.7182 AU
- Eccentricity: 0.1059
- Orbital period (sidereal): 4.48 yr (1,637 d)
- Mean anomaly: 266.57°
- Mean motion: 0° 13^{m} 11.64^{s} / day
- Inclination: 4.6346°
- Longitude of ascending node: 205.20°
- Argument of perihelion: 161.66°

Physical characteristics
- Mean diameter: 19.689±0.146 km; 21.78±1.9 km; 23.58±0.51 km
- Synodic rotation period: 164.1±0.1 h
- Geometric albedo: 0.189±0.009; 0.2144±0.042; 0.262±0.057
- Spectral type: SMASS = K
- Absolute magnitude (H): 10.8

460 Scania (/ˈskeɪiə/; prov. designation: A900 UF or 1900 FN) is a background asteroid and a slow rotator from the central regions of the asteroid belt. It was discovered by German astronomer Max Wolf at the Heidelberg-Königstuhl State Observatory on 22 October 1900. The uncommon K-type asteroid has an exceptionally long rotation period of 164.1 hours and measures approximately 21 kilometers (13 miles) in diameter. It was named after the Swedish region of Scania, where a meeting was held by the Astronomische Gesellschaft in 1904.

== Orbit and classification ==
Scania is a non-family asteroid from the main belt's background population. It orbits the Sun in the central asteroid belt at a distance of 2.4–3.0 AU once every 4 years and 6 months (1,637 days; semi-major axis of 2.72 AU). Its orbit has an eccentricity of 0.11 and an inclination of 5° with respect to the ecliptic. The body's observation arc begins at Vienna Observatory on 25 October 1900, three nights after its official discovery observation at Heidelberg.

== Naming ==
This minor planet was named after the Swedish region of Scania or Skåne by its Latin name, on the occasion of a meeting held in Lund by the Astronomische Gesellschaft in 1904 (AN, 166, 207). The naming was also mentioned in The Names of the Minor Planets by Paul Herget in 1955 (H 50).

== Physical characteristics ==
In the Bus–Binzel SMASS classification, Scania is an uncommon K-type asteroid.

=== Rotation period ===
In December 2017, a rotational lightcurve of Scania was obtained from photometric observations by Frederick Pilcher. Lightcurve analysis gave a well defined rotation period of 164.1±0.1 hours with a brightness variation of 0.37±0.03 magnitude (U=3). The results supersedes previous observations.

=== Diameter and albedo ===
According to the surveys carried out by the Infrared Astronomical Satellite IRAS, the Japanese Akari satellite and the NEOWISE mission of NASA's Wide-field Infrared Survey Explorer, Scania measures between 19.689 and 23.58 kilometers in diameter and its surface has an albedo between 0.189 and 0.262. The Collaborative Asteroid Lightcurve Link derives an albedo of 0.1808 and a diameter of 21.63 kilometers based on an absolute magnitude of 10.8.
