= David Sheppard (broadcaster) =

British broadcaster and voice-over artist

- Born: 6 November 1981 (age 44); Reading, Berkshire, England
- Occupations: radio presenter and voice-over artist
- Presenting career
- Show: David Sheppard
- Stations: BBC Radio Devon; BBC Radio Cornwall; BBC Radio Guernsey; BBC Radio Jersey
- Network: BBC Radio
- Time slot: late night
- Country: England
- Website: www.davidsheppard.info

David Thomas Sheppard (born 6 November 1981), sometimes known as Shep, is an English broadcaster.

He has presented regular shows on BBC Radio Berkshire, BBC Radio Oxford and BBC Radio Devon, where he hosted a long-running afternoon show. He has also worked at BBC Radio Solent and BBC Radio Bristol, mostly presenting regional programmes for the South and West. Until 2023, he presented a nightly regional show for BBC South West, networked across BBC Radio Devon, Cornwall, Guernsey and Jersey, one of the most popular regional downloads on BBC Sounds. He later cited changes to the BBC's music policy and neglect of older audiences as drivers for his decision to leave the corporation, feeling he "probably wouldn't be doing (his) best work" there.

He is the male voice of Great Western Railway, heard on trains and stations throughout the network and provides on-board voice announcements for several other transport operators in the UK, including Reading Buses and Heathrow Airport's Flightline coaches. Other voiceover credits include BBC1 and BBC2 television, BBC Radio 1, Kerrang!, Vue Cinemas and Brilliant TV. He also works across the UK as a live events host.

He presents The Bus Inspectors podcast, an audio series following a project to grade the nation's historic vehicles and tell their stories.

He studied at University of Oxford and University of Bristol, beginning his radio career at the latter in 2001 while running Burst Radio, the student radio station.

== Other appearances ==
Sheppard's addiction to coffee was documented in a BBC2 television documentary The Truth About Food, in which he and former Tomorrow's World presenter Maggie Philbin were tested for the effects of caffeine deprivation.

From the age of 16 he was also a daily contributor to BBC Radio 2's Wake Up to Wogan, under the guise of the Assistant to the BBC's (then) Director-General, Greg Dyke.

Sheppard owns several vintage vehicles including a coach which he has restored himself, and is a trustee and director of the Thames Valley & Great Western Omnibus Trust. He was also a member of the Broadcasters' Bus Consortium, a group of five radio presenters (including Ken Bruce) who co-owned a Routemaster bus.
