= Thomas D. Shepherd =

American football player and coach (1889–1954)

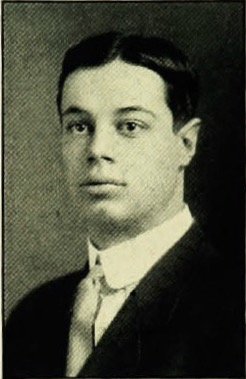
- Shepherd in the 1912 edition of The Prism, Maine yearbook

Biographical details
- Born: August 2, 1889; Belmont, Massachusetts, U.S.
- Died: October 5, 1954 (aged 65); Elmira, New York, U.S.
- Education: University of Maine

Playing career
- 1908: Wesleyan
- 1910–1912: Maine
- Position: Fullback

Coaching career (HC unless noted)
- 1914: New Hampshire
- 1915: Baker
- 1919: Trinity (CT)

Administrative career (AD unless noted)
- 1915: Baker

Head coaching record
- Overall: 8–13–2

Accomplishments and honors

Championships
- 1 KCAC (1915)

Thomas Dudley Shepherd (Note: His surname appears as Shepard, Sheppard, or Shepherd in various sources; he wrote his surname as Shepherd on his draft registration cards.) (August 2, 1889 – October 5, 1954) was an American college football player and coach. He served as the head football coach at New Hampshire College of Agriculture and the Mechanic Arts (now the University of New Hampshire) in 1914, Baker University in Baldwin City, Kansas in 1915, and Trinity College of in Hartford, Connecticut in 1919, compiling a career coaching record of 8–13–2.

== Biography ==
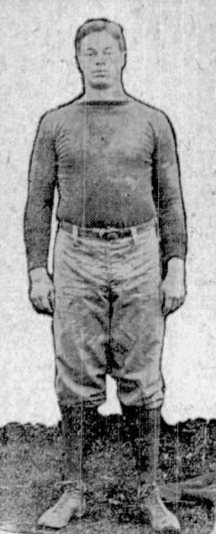
Shepherd in 1911

Shepherd graduated from Wellesley High School in Massachusetts, and initially attended Wesleyan College in Connecticut, where he was a member of their 1908 football team, then entered the University of Maine in his sophomore year. He played football for Maine from 1910 to 1912, where he was noted "because of his punting, field goals and aggressiveness as a back." In an October 1910 game, he successfully kicked four field goals, which was notable in that era. A fullback, he was captain of the 1912 team. He also competed in track and field for Maine, in the hammer throw and shot put. He was a member of Psi Upsilon fraternity.

Shepherd served as head coach of the New Hampshire football team at New Hampshire College of Agriculture and the Mechanic Arts in Durham, New Hampshire, (Note: The school became the University of New Hampshire in 1923 and adopted the Wildcats nickname in 1926.) in 1914, where he compiled a 1–6–2 record. In 1915, he was appointed head football coach, director of gymnasium, and manager of athletics at Baker University in Baldwin City, Kansas. In 1916, Shepherd was athletic director at Maine Central Institute, a private boarding school. He coached the 1919 football team of Trinity College in Hartford, Connecticut, taking over during the season following the resignation of his predecessor. He led the team to a 2–4 record. He was also athletic director and football coach at Manlius Academy (now Manlius Pebble Hill School) near Syracuse, New York.

Shepherd had three brothers, was married, and had one son. During World War I, he served in the United States Navy. He moved to Elmira, New York, in November 1937, where he worked as an insurance agent until his death. He died in Elmira in October 1954, of a heart attack at age 65.

== Head coaching record ==
Shepherd is listed in the New Hampshire media guide as T.D. Sheppard, and in the Trinity media guide as T. Shepard. In the Maine media guide, he appears in the list of all-time lettermen as Thomas D. Shepard.

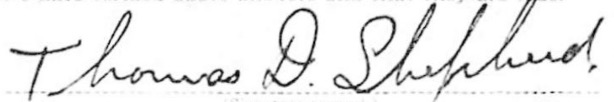
Signature on draft registration card of 1917, Thomas D. Shepherd

Year	Team	Overall	Conference	Standing	Bowl/playoffs
New Hampshire (Independent) (1914)
1914	New Hampshire	1–6–2			
New Hampshire:		1–6–2			
Baker Wildcats (Kansas Collegiate Athletic Conference) (1915)
1915	Baker	5–3	4–0	T–1st	
Baker:		5–3	4–0		
Trinity Bantams (Independent) (1919)
1919	Trinity	2–4			
Trinity:		2–4			
Total:		8–13–2			
National championship Conference title Conference division title or championship game berth
