= Chester, Massachusetts =

- Town
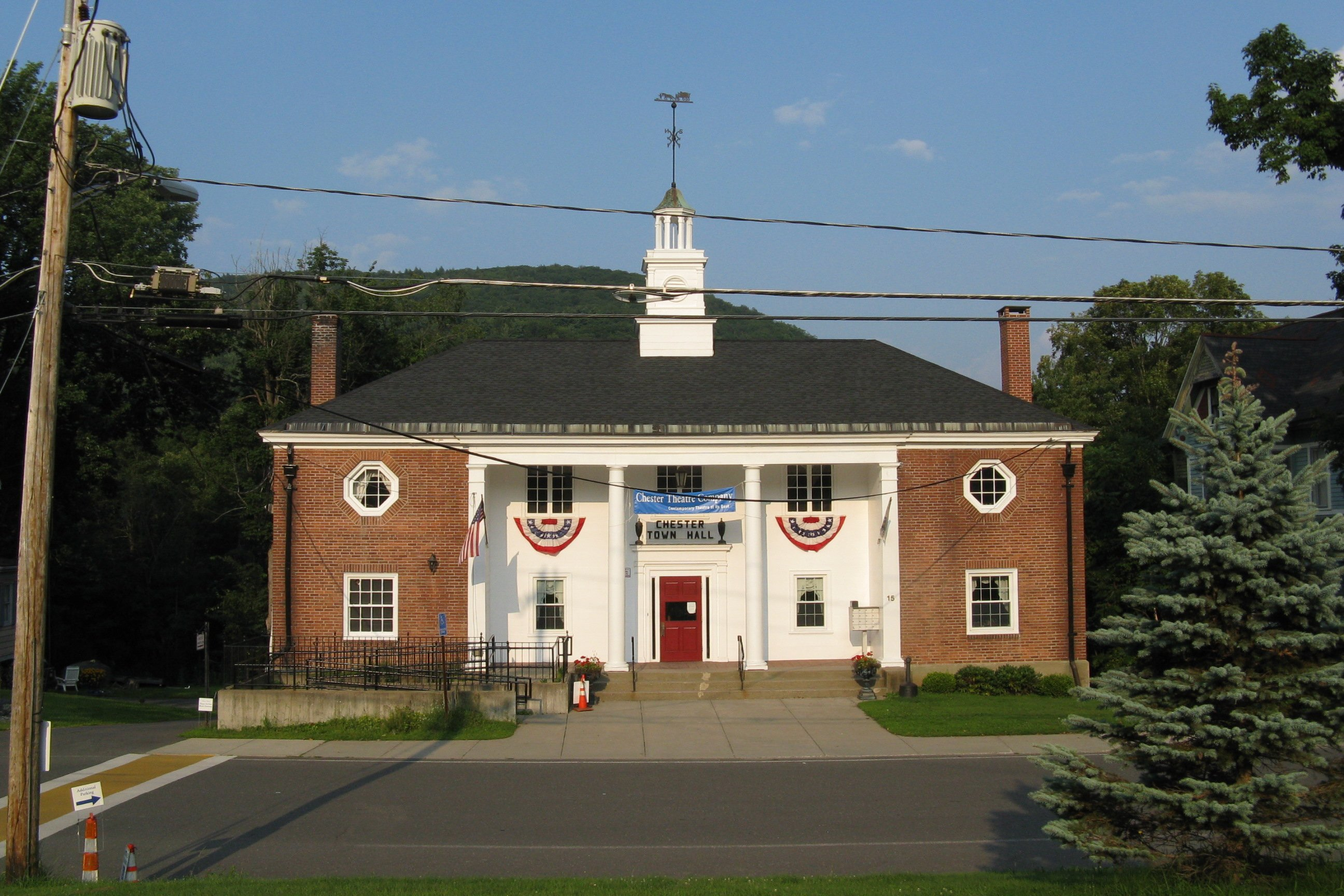
- Town Hall

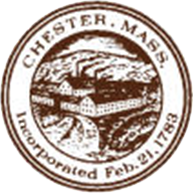
- Seal

- Location in Hampden County in Massachusetts
- Coordinates: 42°16′45″N 72°58′45″W
- Country: United States
- State: Massachusetts
- County: Hampden
- Settled: 1760
- Incorporated: 1783

Government
  - Type: Open town meeting

Area
  - Total: 37.2 sq mi (96.3 km^{2})
  - Land: 36.6 sq mi (94.8 km^{2})
  - Water: 0.58 sq mi (1.5 km^{2})
- Elevation: 600 ft (183 m)

Population (2020)
  - Total: 1,228
  - Density: 33.5/sq mi (13.0/km^{2})
- Time zone: UTC-5 (Eastern)
  - Summer (DST): UTC-4 (Eastern)
- ZIP Codes: 01011 (Chester); 01050 (Huntington)
- Area code: 413
- FIPS code: 25-13485
- GNIS feature ID: 0619385
- Website: townofchester.net

Chester is a town in Hampden County, Massachusetts, United States, situated in Western Massachusetts. It is part of the Springfield metropolitan statistical area. The town includes the Chester Factory Village Historic District. The total population was 1,228 in the 2020 census.

== History ==
Most of what is now the towns of Huntington and Chester were sold at auction (along with other parcels) on June 2, 1762, as Plantation Number 9, to William Williams for £1,500. It was incorporated as Murrayfield by the Massachusetts General Court on October 31, 1765. The town’s name was often confused with that of nearby Myrifield, also spelled “Merryfield” (now Rowe, Massachusetts) so the town petitioned the General Court to change its name to “Fairfield”. The General Court chose the name “Chester” instead and passed the act to change its name on February 21, 1783.

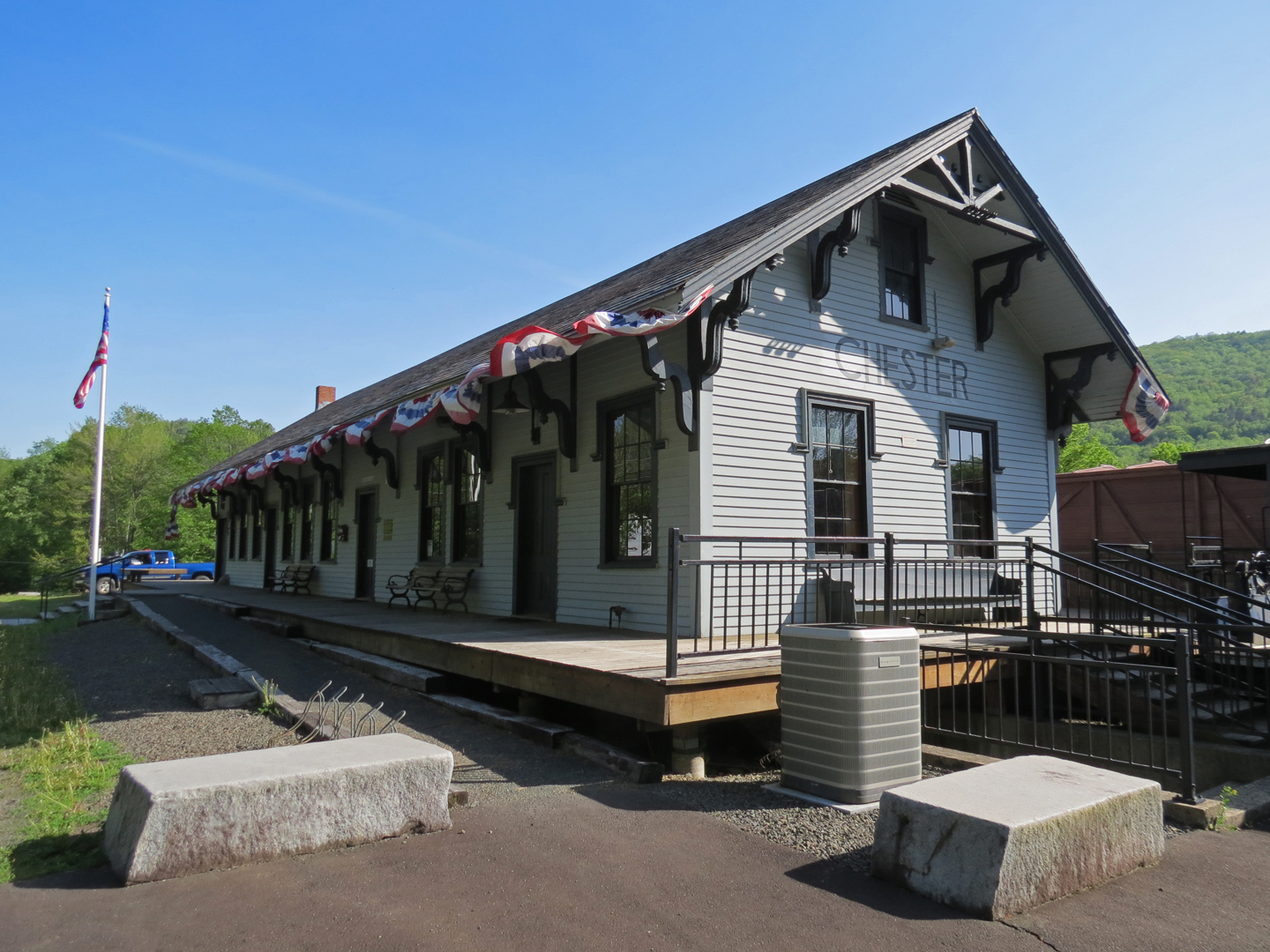
Chester Railroad Station

The Western Railroad (later Boston & Albany Railroad) opened to Chester on May 24, 1841. In 1893 the collapse of a railroad bridge in Chester killed 14 people.

Historical images of Chester, Massachusetts
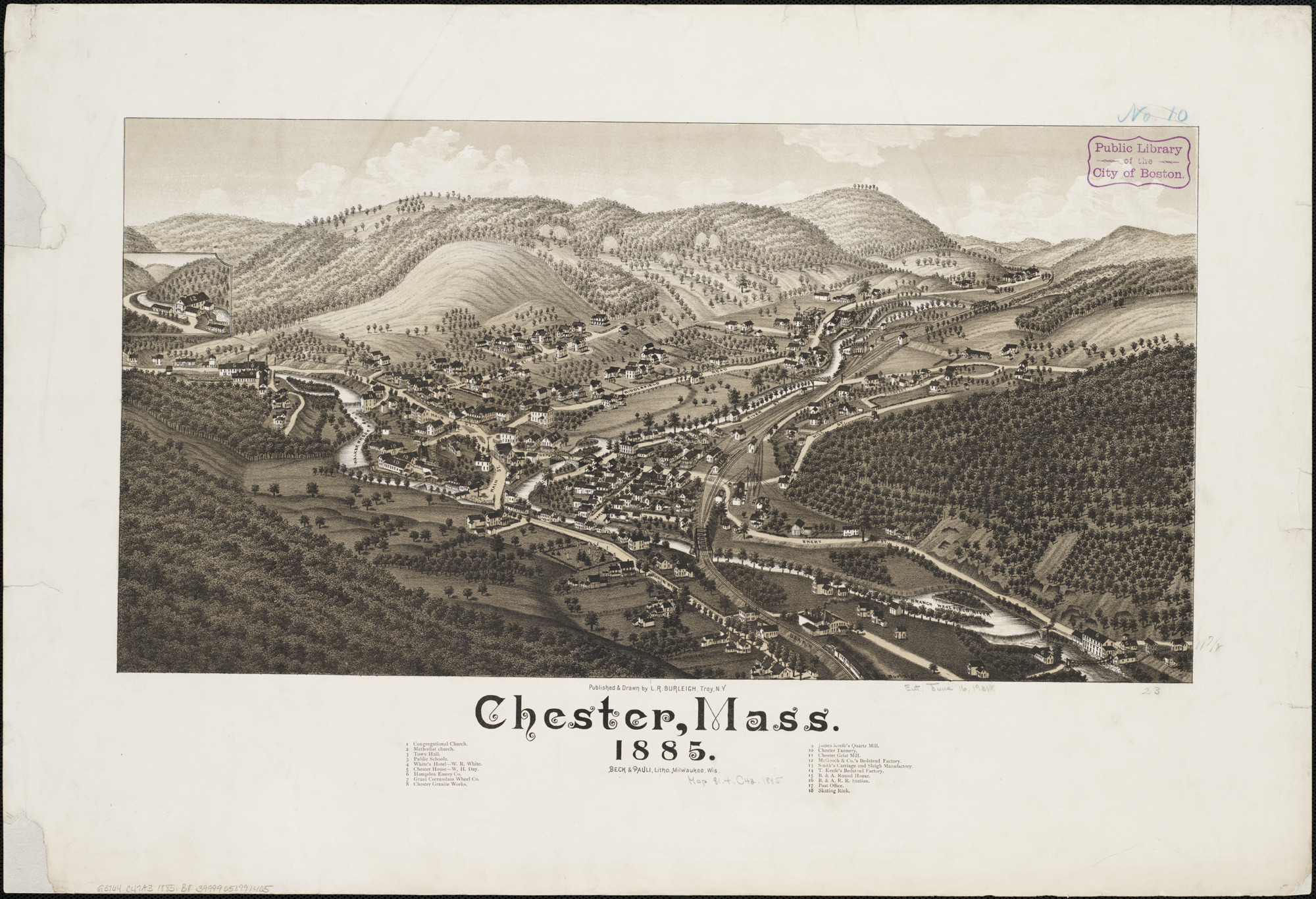
Lithograph of Chester from 1885 by L.R. Burleigh

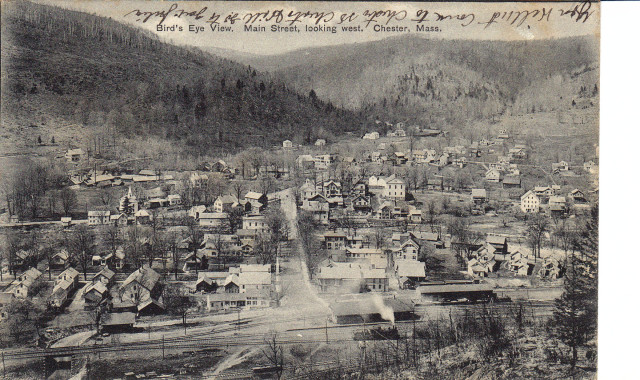
Aerial view of the town in 1905

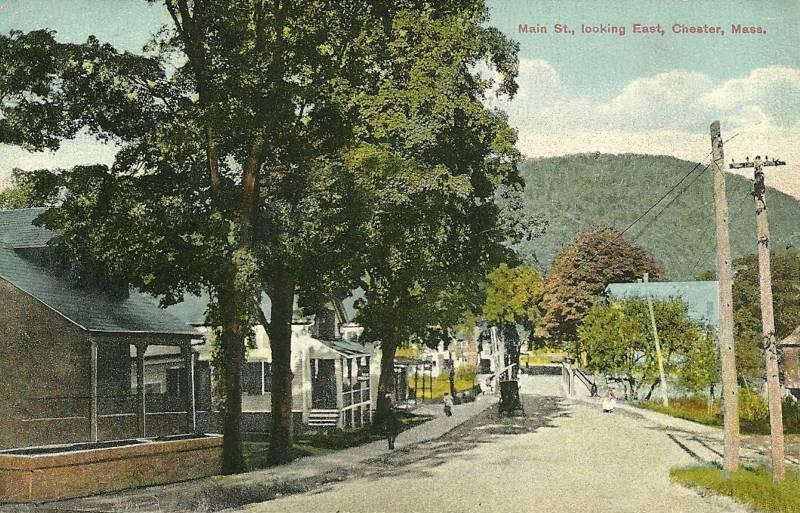
Main Street in 1910

== Geography ==
Set on the eastern edge of the Berkshires, Chester forms the northwestern corner of Hampden County. It is bordered by Huntington on the east, Worthington and Middlefield on the north, Becket on the west, and Blandford on the south. Chester is 21 miles (34 km) southeast of Pittsfield, 30 miles (48 km) northwest of Springfield, 115 miles (185 km) west of Boston, 60 miles (97 km) southeast of Albany, New York, and 150 miles (240 km) northeast of New York City.

According to the United States Census Bureau, the town has a total area of 37.2 square miles (96.3 km^{2}), of which 36.6 square miles (94.8 km^{2}) are land and 0.58 square miles (1.5 km^{2}), or 1.56%, are water. It is drained by tributaries of the Westfield River. Many brooks flow into the Westfield throughout Chester. The West Branch of the Westfield flows through the western and southern parts of town and passes through the village of Chester, while the Middle Branch flows through the northern and eastern parts of the town, passing through the villages of North Chester and Dayville. The small village of Chester Center occupies high ground between the two river branches. U.S. Route 20 follows the West Branch from the southeastern corner of the town to Chester village, then turns west up the valley of Walker Brook on its way to the town of Becket.

=== Temperature records ===
On August 2, 1975, the temperature in Chester rose to 107 °F (42 °C). This remains the hottest temperature ever recorded in the state of Massachusetts, along with a similar reading in New Bedford on the same day. On January 12, 1981, the temperature at Chester fell to −35 °F (−37 °C), the coldest temperature ever recorded in Massachusetts. Thus, Chester is only one of three places in the United States which has recorded both of its state's extreme temperatures, the others being Millsboro, Delaware, and Warsaw, Missouri.

== Demographics ==
Historical population
Year	Pop.	±%
1790	1,119	—
1850	1,521	+35.9%
1860	1,314	−13.6%
1870	1,253	−4.6%
1880	1,473	+17.6%
1890	1,295	−12.1%
1900	1,450	+12.0%
1910	1,377	−5.0%
1920	1,302	−5.4%
1930	1,464	+12.4%
1940	1,284	−12.3%
1950	1,292	+0.6%
1960	1,155	−10.6%
1970	1,025	−11.3%
1980	1,123	+9.6%
1990	1,280	+14.0%
2000	1,308	+2.2%
2010	1,337	+2.2%
2020	1,228	−8.2%
2022	1,220	−0.7%
Source: United States census records and Population Estimates Program data.

As of the census of 2000, there were 1,308 people, 500 households, and 360 families residing in the town. The population density was 35.6 inhabitants per square mile (13.7/km^{2}). There were 580 housing units at an average density of 15.8 per square mile (6.1/km^{2}). The racial makeup of the town was 98.24% White, 0.15% African American, 0.46% Native American, 0.08% Asian, 0.31% from other races, and 0.76% from two or more races. Hispanic or Latino of any race were 1.30% of the population.

There were 500 households, out of which 35.0% had children under the age of 18 living with them, 60.0% were married couples living together, 7.6% had a female householder with no husband present, and 27.8% were non-families. 21.2% of all households were made up of individuals, and 8.6% had someone living alone who was 65 years of age or older. The average household size was 2.62 and the average family size was 3.06.

In the town, the population was spread out, with 25.0% under the age of 18, 7.3% from 18 to 24, 30.2% from 25 to 44, 26.1% from 45 to 64, and 11.5% who were 65 years of age or older. The median age was 39 years. For every 100 females, there were 106.0 males. For every 100 females age 18 and over, there were 102.3 males.

The median income for a household in the town was $43,816, and the median income for a family was $51,932. Males had a median income of $38,083 versus $25,789 for females. The per capita income for the town was $18,098. About 2.9% of families and 5.8% of the population were below the poverty line, including 3.0% of those under age 18 and 7.8% of those age 65 or over.

== Education ==
The town is part of the Gateway Regional School District.

== Library ==
The Chester public library was established in 1894. In fiscal year 2008, the town of Chester spent 1.04% ($28,512) of its budget on its public library—some $22 per person.

== Theater ==
Chester is home to Chester Theatre Company, a professional summer theater founded in 1990.

== Notable people ==
- Rowland Day, congressman
- Capt. David Shepard, American doctor and soldier; an early proponent of inoculation to prevent smallpox
