= List of arts organizations in Boston =

The American city of Boston, Massachusetts, is home to many arts organizations in many disciplines. They include:

- Abilities Dance Boston
- ArtsBoston
- ArtsEmerson
- The Art Institute of Boston
- Artists For Humanity
- Blue Heron Renaissance Choir
- Boch Center
- Boston Arts Academy
- Boston Ballet
- Boston Baroque
- Boston Center for the Arts
- Boston Children's Chorus
- Boston Chamber Music Society
- Boston Children's Museum
- Boston Crusaders
- Boston Cyberarts Festival
- Boston Early Music Festival
- Boston Gay Men's Chorus
- Boston Landmarks Orchestra
- Boston Lyric Opera
- Boston Modern Orchestra Project
- Boston Musica Viva
- Boston Philharmonic
- Boston Playwrights Theatre
- Boston Public Art Triennial
- Boston Symphony Orchestra
- Boston Youth Symphony Orchestras
- Celebrity Series of Boston
- Central Square Theater
- Chuang Stage
- Commonwealth Shakespeare Company
- Coro Allegro
- Dinosaur Annex Music Ensemble
- New England Philharmonic
- First Act Guitar Studio
- First Night Boston
- Fort Point Arts Community
- Front Porch Arts Collective
- Global Arts Live
- Grub Street
- Handel and Haydn Society
- HarborArts
- Huntington Theatre Company
- Institute of Contemporary Art
- Isabella Stewart Gardner Museum
- JazzBoston
- Lyric Stage Boston
- Mobius Artists Group
- Museum of Fine Arts, Boston
- National Center of Afro-American Artists
- New England Foundation for the Arts
- New England Philharmonic
- North End Music & Performing Arts Center
- Odyssey Opera
- Opera Boston
- Photographic Resource Center
- Pro Arte Chamber Orchestra
- Puppet Showplace Theater
- Speakeasy Stage Company
- The Society of Arts and Crafts of Boston
- The Theater Offensive
- Wheelock Family Theatre
- Zumix

== See also ==
- Culture of Boston
