= South Bay Harbor Trail =

Rail trail in Massachusetts, United States

Coordinates: 42.346°N 71.055°W

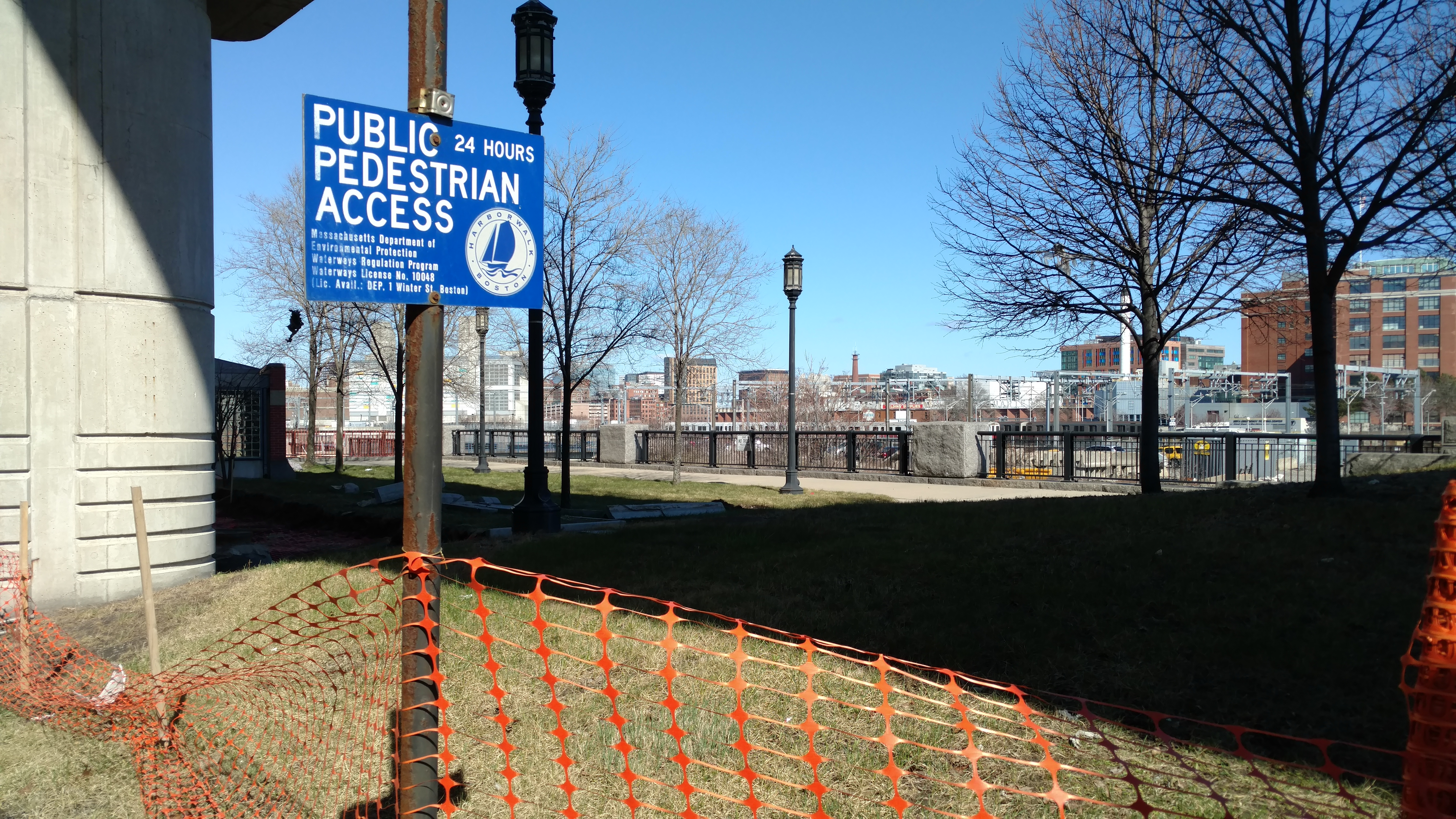
South Bay Harbor Trail, adjacent to Fort Point Channel and the Interstate 93 viaduct

The South Bay Harbor Trail is a mixed-use path in Boston, Massachusetts opened in 2011 The rail trail extends from Ruggles Station along Melnea Cass Boulevard, across Massachusetts Avenue, along Biosquare Drive near the Massachusetts Avenue Connector, under the Southeast Expressway (Interstate 93), and connects with the Boston Harborwalk in Rolling Bridge Park on Fort Point Channel. The designation continues with the Harborwalk along the channel until Fan Pier, where showers, lockers, and bike storage will be constructed.

The rail trail cost $4.9 million, paid for by federal highway funds with state match, private property owners which the path crosses, and about $1 million in private fundraising by the non-profit Save The Harbor.
