= USCGC William Sparling =

US Coast Guard Cutter

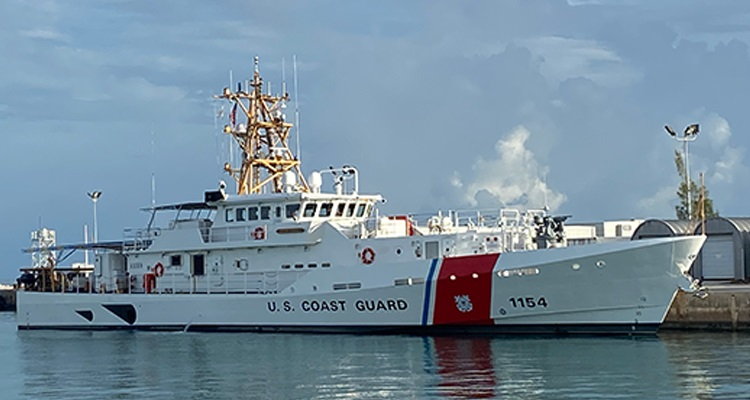

History

United States
- Name: William Sparling
- Namesake: William Sparling
- Operator: United States Coast Guard
- Builder: Bollinger Shipyards, Lockport, Louisiana
- Sponsored by: Caroline Sparling
- Acquired: July 20, 2023
- Commissioned: October 19, 2023
- Home port: Coast Guard Base Boston
- Identification: Hull number: WPC-1154
- Motto: Courageous Devotion
- Status: in active service
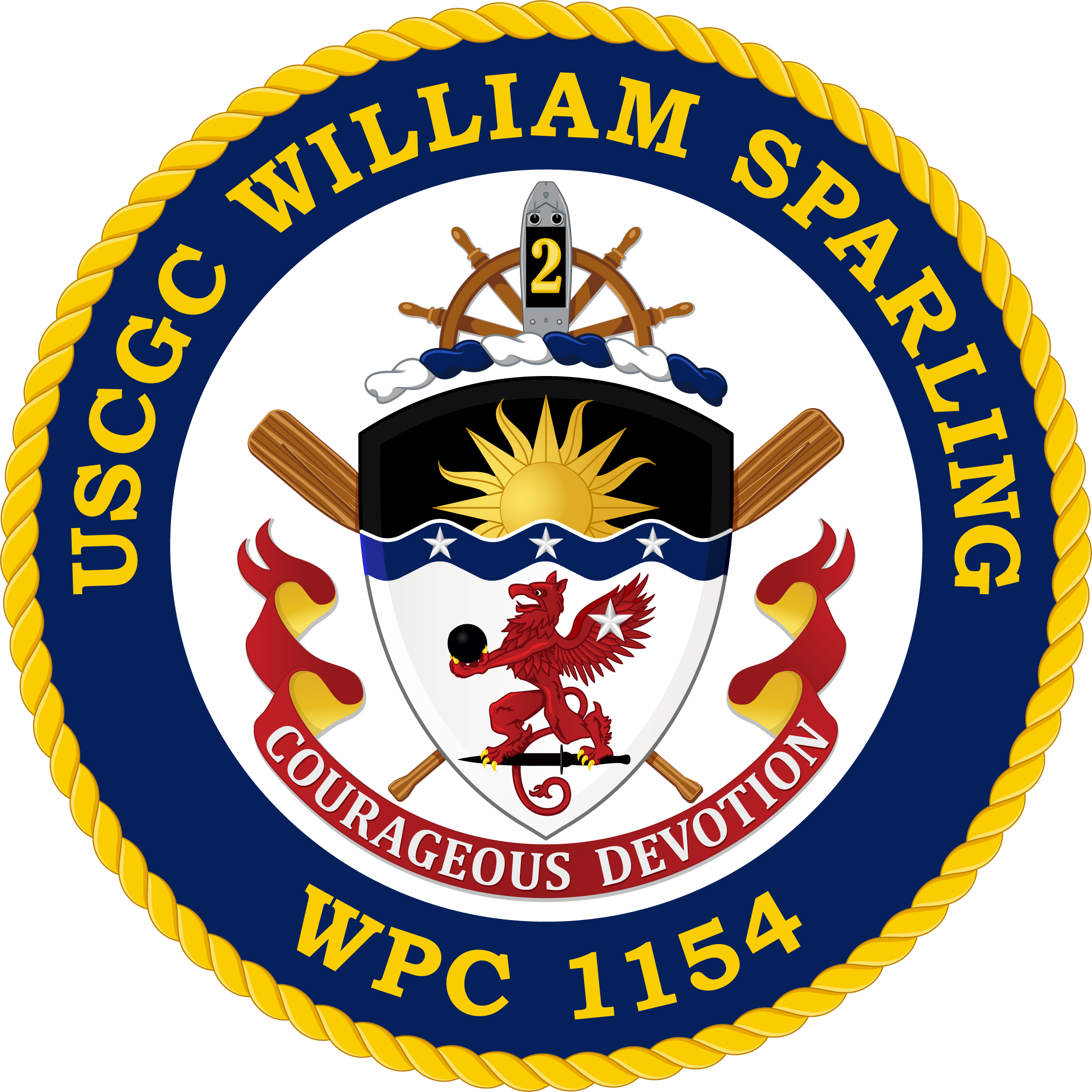
- Badge

General characteristics
- Class & type: Sentinel-class cutter
- Displacement: 353 long tons (359 t)
- Length: 46.8 m (154 ft)
- Beam: 8.11 m (26.6 ft)
- Depth: 2.9 m (9.5 ft)
- Propulsion: 2 × 4,300 kW (5,800 shp); 1 × 75 kW (101 shp) bow thruster
- Speed: 28 knots (52 km/h; 32 mph)
- Range: 2,500 nautical miles (4,600 km; 2,900 mi)
- Endurance: 5 days
- Boats & landing craft carried: 1 × Cutter Boat - Over the Horizon Interceptor
- Complement: 4 officers, 20 crew
- Sensors & processing systems: L-3 C4ISR suite
- Armament: 1 × Mk 38 Mod 2 25 mm automatic gun; 4 × crew-served Browning M2 machine guns

USCGC William Sparling (WPC-1154) is the United States Coast Guard's 54th Sentinel-class cutter.

== Design ==
Like her sister ships, William Sparling is designed to perform search and rescue missions, port security, and the interception of smugglers. She is armed with a remotely-controlled, gyro-stabilized 25 mm autocannon, four crew served M2 Browning machine guns, and light arms. She is equipped with a stern launching ramp, that allows her to launch or retrieve a water-jet propelled high-speed auxiliary boat, without first coming to a stop. Her high-speed boat has over-the-horizon capability, and is useful for inspecting other vessels, and deploying boarding parties.

The crew's drinking water needs are met through a desalination unit. The crew mess is equipped with a television with satellite reception.

== Operational career ==
On 15 August 2022, it was announced that William Sparling would be homeported at Coast Guard Base Boston in Boston, Massachusetts.

The vessel's manufacturer, Bollinger Shipyards, of Lockport, Louisiana, delivered the ship to the Coast Guard, for her sea trials, in Key West, on July 20, 2023. She was commissioned at Station Portsmouth Harbor in New Castle, New Hampshire on October 19, 2023. Her sponsor was William "Bill" Sparling's widow Caroline Sparling and her first commanding officer was Lt. Jacklyn "Jackie" Kokomoor.

On October 3rd, 2026 the cutter was involved in a search for a missing and presumed downed medevac flight that was en route from the Bahamas to Boston-Logan International Airport. Debris has been found in the search area off Nantucket but it is unclear whether the cutter was involved in that discovery or any further possible recovery operations.

== Namesake ==
In 2010, Master Chief Petty Officer of the Coast Guard Charles "Skip" W. Bowen, who was then the United States Coast Guard's most senior non-commissioned officer, proposed that all 58 cutters in the Sentinel class should be named after enlisted sailors in the Coast Guard, or one of its precursor services, who were recognized for their heroism. The Coast Guard chose William Sparling as the namesake of the 54th cutter. Sparling, and three other Coast Guard sailors, piloted the first landing craft during the United States's first amphibious landing, in the Pacific Theater, during World War II. Sparling, and his three colleagues were each awarded a Silver Star medal for this task. His colleagues Daniel Tarr, Harold Miller and Glen Harris have Sentinel-class cutters named after them.
