= Martin Richard Foundation =

American non-profit organization

The Martin W. Richard Charitable Foundation is a 501(c)(3) tax-exempt charitable foundation established by Bill and Denise Richard, the parents of Martin William Richard (June 9, 2004 – April 15, 2013), an 8-year-old boy who was killed in the Boston Marathon bombing on April 15, 2013. The foundation is dedicated to promoting education and sports in the community. Martin's vision of "peace," in addition to an absence of violence, included sportsmanship, teamwork, and creating a sense of inclusion and belonging.

Since 2014, the foundation has raised money through its charity team at the annual Boston Marathon. Team MR8, named after Martin Richard's initials and his favorite sports number, is composed of volunteer runners, including runners who may not usually qualify to run in the race due to their time scores. The team members raise money for the foundation, which in turn invests in projects such as the Challenger Sports program at the Boys and Girls Club of Dorchester, the Martin Richard Park Project, and community clean-ups. Donations to the Challenger Sports club help finance athletics programs for children with disabilities.

During 2016's "One Boston Day," held annually on April 15, the foundation sponsored a community clean-up of Dorchester's Peabody Square and Dorchester Avenue. Team MR8 raised $1.25 million during the 2014 Boston Marathon Race and raised over $2 million as of March 2016.

== 2014 Marathon ==
In the 2014 Boston Marathon, 38-year-old Rachel Moo of Dorchester, a former teacher of Martin Richard, ran the marathon in his honor. Moo described Martin as having been "very caring, constantly," adding that Martin would often comfort someone who was feeling sad or hurt, often being the "first person to go over to them to make sure they were OK." Moo was Martin's teacher when Martin made his now-iconic "Peace" sign. Finishing the marathon with a time of 05:38:52, shortly after 5:30 p.m., Moo said that she felt Martin's presence, as though Martin was physically running beside her.

== Martin's Park ==
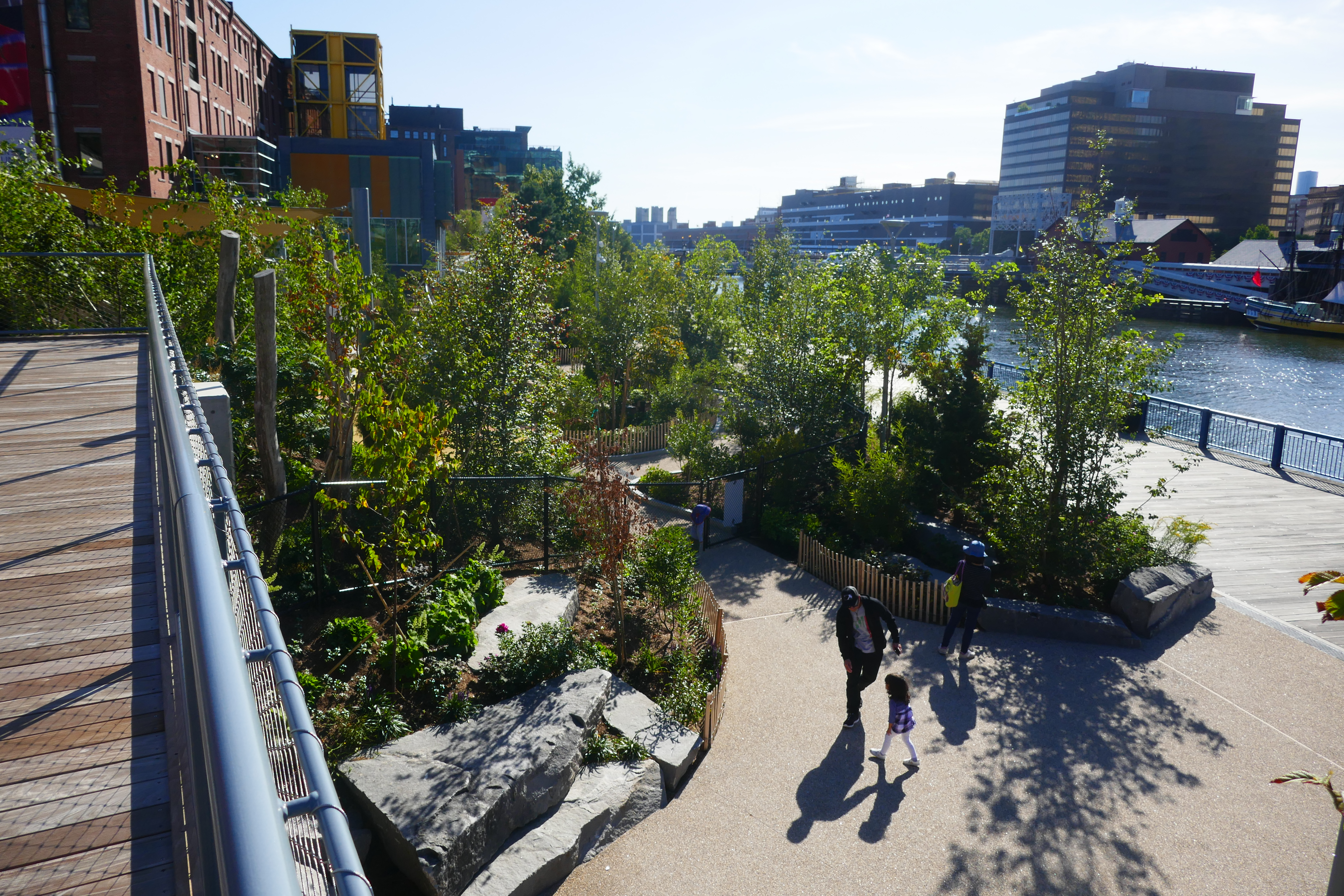
Martin's Park

Martin's Park, which opened in 2019, is located in the Seaport District adjacent to the Boston Children's Museum. Construction began in June 2017, following a $13 million investment from the Martin Richard Foundation. The park overlooks Fort Point Channel and features a children's playground, a performance space, and an upgraded Harborwalk, as well as a garden and water park.

Martin's Park opened on June 15, 2019, with hundreds of people in attendance at the grand opening ceremony. Martin's sister, Jane, who survived the 2013 attack but lost a leg, sang the song "A Million Dreams" from The Greatest Showman, while Henry, Martin's brother, shared hopes that the park will promote "inclusion and peace."
