= USCGC Melvin Bell =

Fast response craft (built 2023)

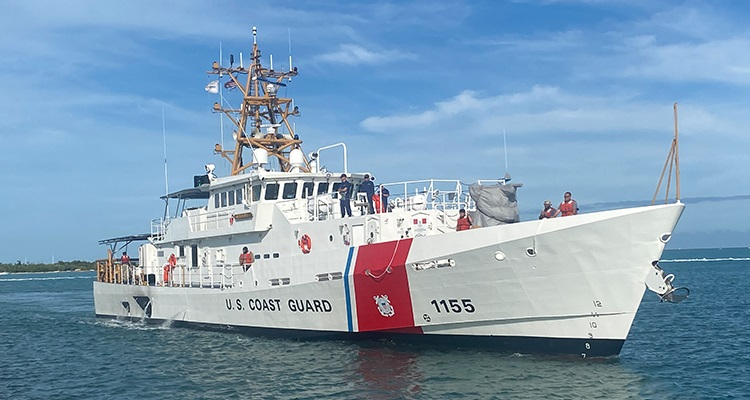

History

United States
- Name: Melvin Bell
- Builder: Bollinger Shipyards
- Commissioned: March 28, 2024
- Home port: Coast Guard Station Boston
- Status: In service

General characteristics
- Class & type: Sentinel-class cutter
- Displacement: 353 long tons (359 t)
- Length: 154 ft (47 m)
- Beam: 25 ft (7.6 m)
- Draft: 9 ft 6 in (2.90 m)
- Propulsion: 2 x MTU diesel engines
- Range: 2,500 nmi (4,600 km; 2,900 mi)
- Complement: 24
- Armament: 1 × Mk. 38 Mod. 2 25 mm autocannon; 4 × .50-caliber M2 machineguns

USCGC Melvin Bell (WPC-1155) is a 154-foot (47 m) United States Coast Guard Fast Response Craft of the Sentinel class, stationed at U.S. Coast Guard Station Boston. She is the 55th vessel of her class and is named for Master Chief Electronics Technician Melvin Kealoha Bell Sr., the first soldier to raise alarm of the Attack on Pearl Harbor and first Pacific Islander to reach rank of chief petty officer.

== Construction ==
The vessel, as well as all others in her class, was constructed by Bollinger Shipyards in Lockport, Louisiana and delivered to the Coast Guard November 17, 2023, at a cost of $65 million. She has an overall length of 154 feet (47 m), a beam of 25 ft (7.6 m), a draft of 9 ft 6 in (2.90 m). She displaces roughly 353 long tons (359 t) with a maximum speed of 28 knots (52 km/h; 32 mph). She has a service range of nearly 2,500 nautical miles. She is crewed by 24 service personnel. Her propulsion comes from twin MTU diesel engines, each turning fixed-pitch propellers for 5,800 horsepower (4,300 kW) each. She features a stern-launch ramp for the vessel's Short-Range Prosecutor rigid-hulled inflatable boat. She is armed with a single Mk 38 Mod 2 25 mm autocannon and four .50-caliber M2 machine guns. All vessels of the class incorporate advanced C4ISR Systems (command, control, communications, computers, intelligence, surveillance, and reconnaissance).

== Service ==
After accepting delivery of the vessel, she would arrive at her homeport (Coast Guard Station Boston) on January 3, 2024, after sea trials off Key West. Lieutenant Patrick Kelly assumed the first command of the vessel, with Rita Mayer serving as its sponsor. Melvin Bell is the sixth and final cutter to join Station Boston. Her and her sister vessels are responsible for patrolling the North Atlantic region, participating in narcotic/migrant interdictions, fisheries law enforcement, port defense, and search and rescue. Her duty zone stretches along the Massachusetts–New Hampshire border.
