= Coast Guard Base Boston =

United States Coast Guard station in Boston, Massachusetts

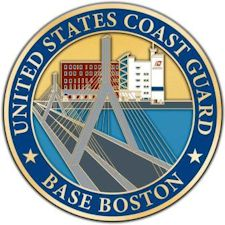
Coast Guard Base Boston
- Part of 1st District
- North End, Boston, Massachusetts
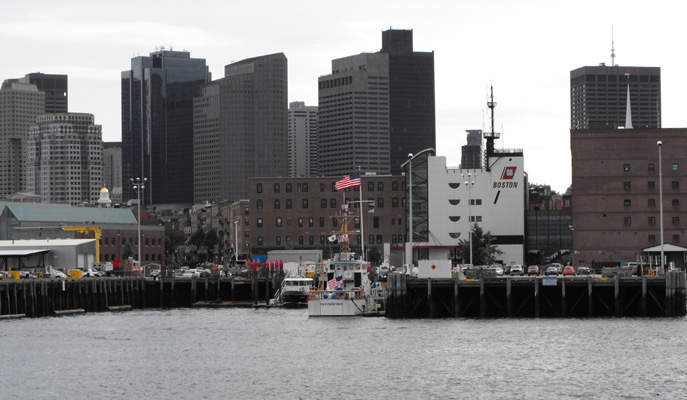
- The station as seen from Charlestown across Boston Harbor. One of its buildings is designed to look like a Coast Guard vessel.

Site information
- Type: Coast Guard station
- Owner: United States Coast Guard

Location
- Coordinates: 42°22′4″N 71°3′9″W

Site history
- In use: 1790–1996; 2003–present

Garrison information
- Current commander: Captain Chad Brick
- Occupants: 6 × Sentinel-class cutters

United States Coast Guard Base Boston is located in the North End, Boston, Massachusetts. It is home to multiple Sentinel-class cutters, along with other small fleet units.

== Description ==
The small boat station located on the base was re-opened in 2003 after being closed in 1996. It is also home to Flotilla 5-3 of the United States Coast Guard Auxiliary.

On 1 March 2021, the United States Department of Homeland Security solicited bids for base modifications to accommodate six new Sentinel-class cutters there. The Coast Guard was expected to take delivery of the first two of these cutters, USCGC William Chadwick (WPC-1150) and USCGC Warren Deyampert (WPC-1151), in the second half of 2022. Those two cutters were deployed in Boston during 2022 and 2023, respectively.

== Cutters ==
The following Sentinel-class cutters are deployed at Coast Guard Base Boston:

- USCGC William Chadwick (WPC-1150)
- USCGC Warren Deyampert (WPC-1151)
- USCGC Maurice Jester (WPC-1152)
- USCGC John Patterson (WPC-1153)
- USCGC William Sparling (WPC-1154)
- USCGC Melvin Bell (WPC-1155)

== See also ==
- List of military installations in Massachusetts
- List of United States Coast Guard stations
