= HarborArts =

- Founded: 2009
- Founder: Steve Israel
- Location(s): 256 Marginal Street; East Boston, Massachusetts, United States
- Coordinates: 42.364093°N 71.03307°W
- Website: www.harborartsboston.com

HarborArts is an art organization located at 256 Marginal Street in East Boston, Massachusetts. It was founded by artist Steve Israel in 2009. The organization uses public art installations to address the vital roles oceans play in the sustainability of the planet, and to promote creative and sustainable ways of living. Its main feature is an outdoor gallery hosted on the grounds of the Boston Harbor Shipyard, on Boston Harborwalk.

== History ==
Founder Steve Israel is an artisan and pioneer in the salvage and recycling industry. Israel's work has been featured on Good Morning America, in Time, and in Newsweek. His focus is on creative and technological advances leading toward a sustainable, responsible utilization of water resources.

The founding project of the organizations was a series of monumental sculptures. One piece is a 40-foot (12 m) orange codfish, an over 2-short-ton (1,800 kg) sculpture made from re-purposed materials currently on display at the HarborArts International Outdoor Gallery.

== Galleries ==
Using the shipyard as a gallery provides a very unique opportunity for people to view and work in. As a working shipyard, it's already a sculpture unto itself.

— Steve Israel on the organization's shipyard gallery

The HarborArts International Outdoor Gallery opened in June 2010 and is located on the grounds of the 15-acre (6.1 ha) Boston Harbor Shipyard and Marina. It features works from over 30 artists from three continents, which are on loan for the minimum of a year. Their 2010 show "Hazards of Modern Living" was juried by Randi Hopkins, Associate Curator of the Institute of Contemporary Art, Boston. New installations are continually added.

HarborArts matched installations with local environmental agencies to draw attention to the work of the member organizations of the Massachusetts Ocean Coalition. The gallery has contributed to the cultural community and tourism industry of Boston.

The organization is currently in development of another gallery to be called The HarborArts Global Gallery. It is modeled after the outdoor gallery and will feature a collection of monumental art to be displayed at locations all around the world.
