= Constitution Beach =

Beach in East Boston, Massachusetts, US

Constitution Beach Shay's Beach
- Beach
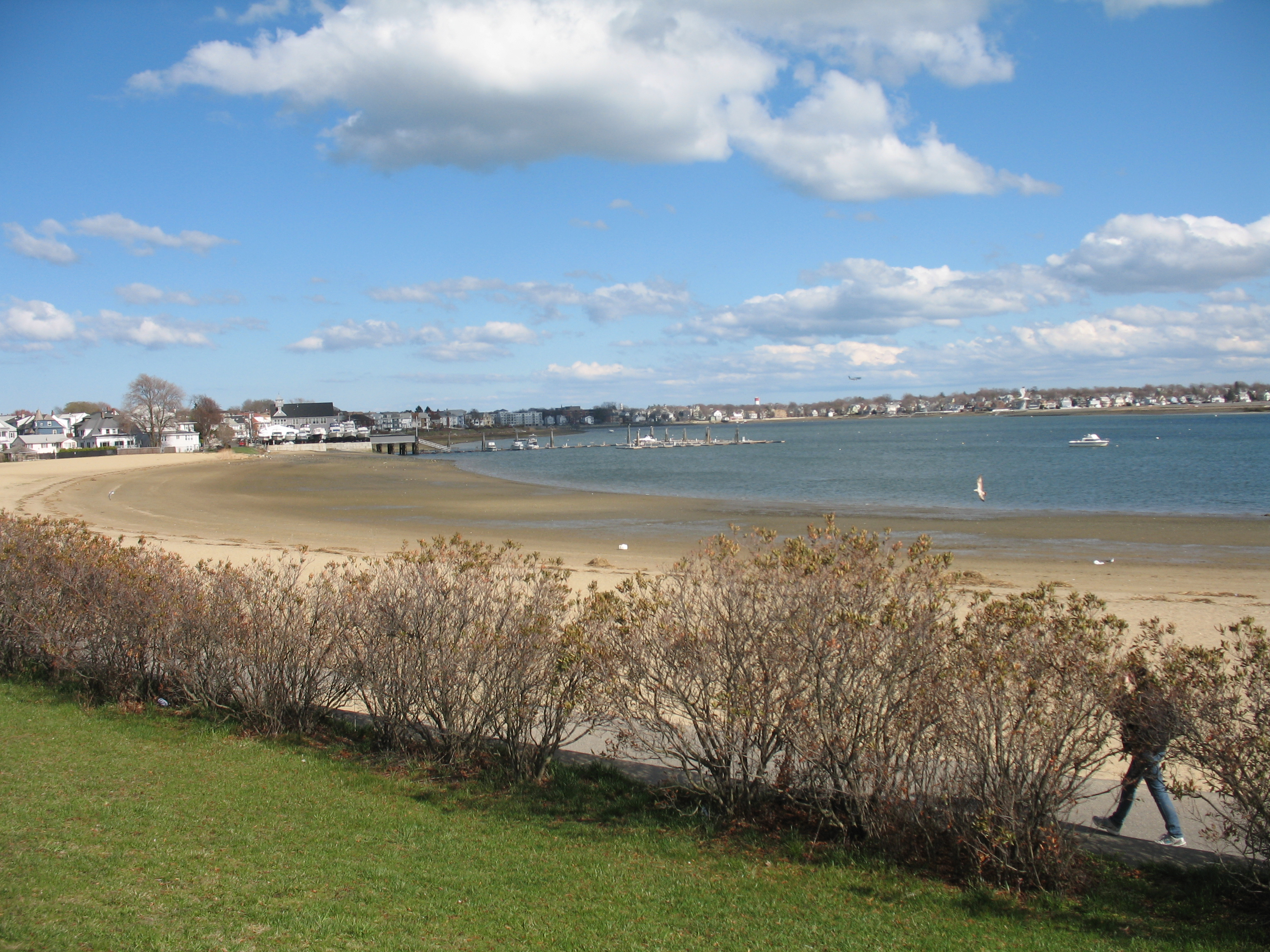
- View of Constitution Beach in 2011

- Location within Massachusetts Location within Greater Boston area
- Coordinates: 42°23′03.90″N 71°00′37.40″W
- Location: East Boston, Massachusetts

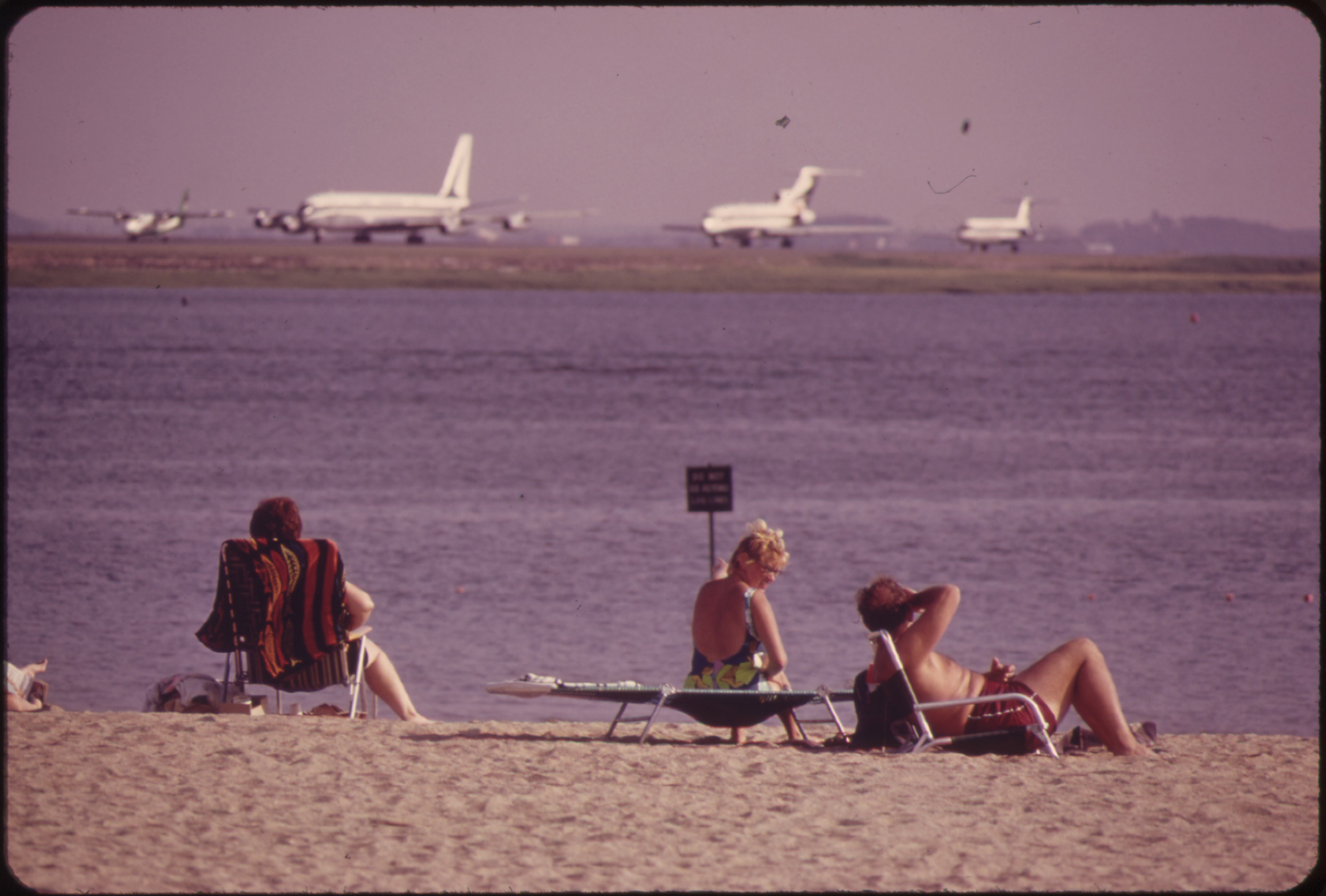
Constitution Beach, 1973

Constitution Beach is a man-made crescent-shaped, sandy beach located in the Orient Heights neighborhood of East Boston, Massachusetts. Opened in 1952 and known to locals as "Shays Beach," its most distinctive feature is that it looks directly onto the runways of Logan International Airport, so that airplanes taking off and landing on Runways 22L and 22R are about 2,000 feet (610 m) away, making them prominent both visibly and audibly.

The easternmost portion of the beach continues to be known to locals as "Shay's Beach."

The beach underwent renovations in the late 1990s as a new public bathhouse and refreshment stand was added, as well as a new pedestrian walkway over the tracks of the Blue Line onto Bennington Street.

The beach is located on 223 acres (90 ha) of land, which was artificially constructed between December 1949 and May 1951. At that time, 34.1 acres (13.8 ha) of land was filled in with hydraulically dredged material and gravel to create the beach, which soon after opened to the public in 1952.

The beach is located in a protected inlet so the water, though part of the Atlantic Ocean, is always relatively placid. There are bathhouse facilities on the beach, as well as a snack bar, a children's playground, handball, basketball, and tennis courts, in addition to baseball fields and an indoor ice rink.

The overpass that was built at the time allowed pedestrians to cross over subway tracks to reach the beach from the busy Bennington Street. It had begun to deteriorate in the 1990s and was replaced by a new structure.

In April 2021, a woman became stuck in the mud at low tide and had to be rescued by firefighters.
