= Pos =

POS, Pos or PoS may refer to:

== Linguistics ==
- Part of speech, the role that a word or phrase plays in a sentence
- Poverty of the stimulus, a linguistic term used in language acquisition and development
- Sayula Popoluca (ISO 639-3), an indigenous language spoken in Veracruz, Mexico

== People ==
- Pos (surname)
- P.O.S (rapper) (born 1981), or Stefon Alexander, American hip hop artist
- POS (singer) (born 1998), a Nigerian singer and songwriter
- Kelvin Mercer (born 1969), also known as Pos, member of the New York hip hop trio De La Soul
- Pain of Salvation, Swedish progressive metal band
- Paavo Siljamäki (born 1977), Finnish DJ and producer, member of the English electronic group Above & Beyond

== Places ==
- Port of Spain, Trinidad and Tobago
- Piarco International Airport (IATA code), Piarco, Trinidad and Tobago
- Pomona–Downtown station (Amtrak station code), California, US

== Science and technology ==
- Political opportunity structure, an approach to explain social movements
- Ppolyendocrine metabolic ovarian syndrome (PMOS), formerly known as polycystic ovary syndrome (PCOS), a disease of the ovaries
- Price of stability, in game theory
- Probability of success, in statistics
- Product of sums, a canonical form in Boolean algebra

=== Computing ===
- P/OS, operating system of DEC Professional PCs from Digital Equipment Corporation
- Packet over SONET/SDH, a communications protocol for transferring packets over fiber networks
- PERQ Operating System, operating system for PERQ workstations
- Proof of space, a cryptocurrency blockchain distributed consensus method
- Proof of stake, a cryptocurrency blockchain distributed consensus method

== Transportation ==
- Post Office Sorting Van, a type of rail vehicle used in a Travelling Post Office train
- TGV POS, a French high-speed train

== Other uses ==
- Pos Indonesia, Indonesian postal service
- Pos Malaysia, Malaysian postal service
- Phi Omega Sigma (disambiguation), a Greek name for any of five different student organizations
- Piece of shit, a phrase considered vulgar and profane in Modern English
- Point of sale, location where payment is accepted
- Point of service plan, a type of managed care health insurance plan in the US
- Polytechnic Secondary School (Polytechnische Oberschule), the 10-year general educational system in East Germany
- Priory of Sion, a fictitious secret society
- Public open space, a planning term for an outdoor public forum

== See also ==
- Post Office Square (disambiguation)
