= William James Hubard =

American painter (1807–1862)

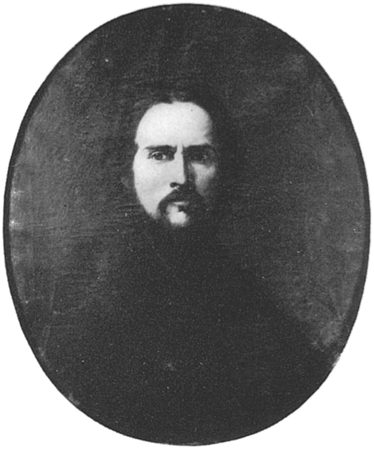
- Self-portrait by William James Hubard, 19th century
- Born: 1807
- Died: February 1862 (aged 54–55); Richmond, Virginia, C.S.
- Occupation: Artist

William James Hubard (1807 – February 1862) was a British-born artist who worked in England and the United States in the 19th century. He specialized in silhouette and painted portraits.

== Biography ==
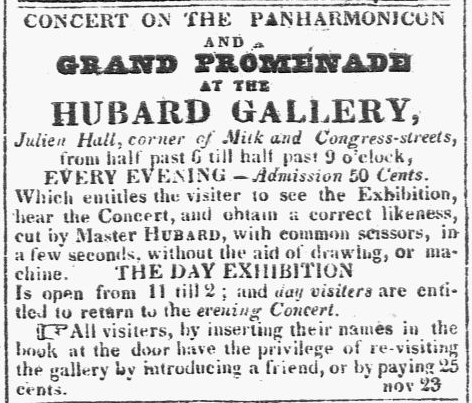
Advertisement for Hubard Gallery, Boston, 1825

Hubard arrived in the United States from England in 1824.

In 1825–1826 he worked in Boston, Massachusetts, setting up an exhibition known as the "Hubard Gallery" at Julien Hall (corner Congress and Milk Streets). At the time Hubard would have been about 18 or 19 years old. A local newspaper reported "there is a great variety of pictures—likenesses, groups of animals, landscape scenery, caricatures, &c.—all cut with a simple pair of scissors, without the aid of any machinery whatever, and which a spectator might, at a hasty glance, take for painting." He received raves in the press: "He exercises his scissors with so much dexterity and skill, that an accurate profile, even of the most 'unmeaning face,' can be procured in twenty-five seconds, without the use of steam." Local resident John George Metcalf visited the gallery in 1825, and wrote in his diary:

Hubard Gallery. This is a collection of cuttings of black paper of all the shapes and figures that can possibly be imagined. The figures after being cut out, are arranged and pasted on white paper which are skilfully and tastefully placed about the Hall. This Astonishing genius is a native of Shropshire in England and is now about fifteen years of age. Here, and all done with only a pair of common scissors, you can see the stately structures of Westminster Abbey, the Catholic Church at Glasgow and others all with their due proportion of light and shade. Here Napoleon has burst from the cearments of the grave and is upon his warhorse, as when on the bloody fields of Austerlitz and Marengo. Franklin too has come back, and stands for the patriot and Philosopher as when at the court of London he said "his Master shall pay for it." Kings and princes have left their gilded mausoleums, and at the will of Master Hubard are set up to be gazed at by clown and cobler. Besides these graver scenes we have the lighter ones of Life. Here Doctor Syntax and his whole Tour can be found and all his scenes of fun and merriment stand forth to be looked and laughed at. Fiddlers, Beggars, Bellmen, Irishmen and others ad infinitum, all as natural as life, all the creation of a pair of common scissors, attract the attention and excite the admiration of many a gazer. Horses and Dogs, pigs and pussies, and all that "sort o' thing," can here be found from the size of a thumb-nail to that of a platter. In fine here any one, if he is not made by one of Nature's journeymen, can find fun and frolic enough to last a week.

Hubard later moved to Richmond, Virginia where he married Maria Mason Tabb, the daughter of wealthy clients in nearby Gloucester County. He also became friends with Mann S. Valentine, II who supported and promoted his work.

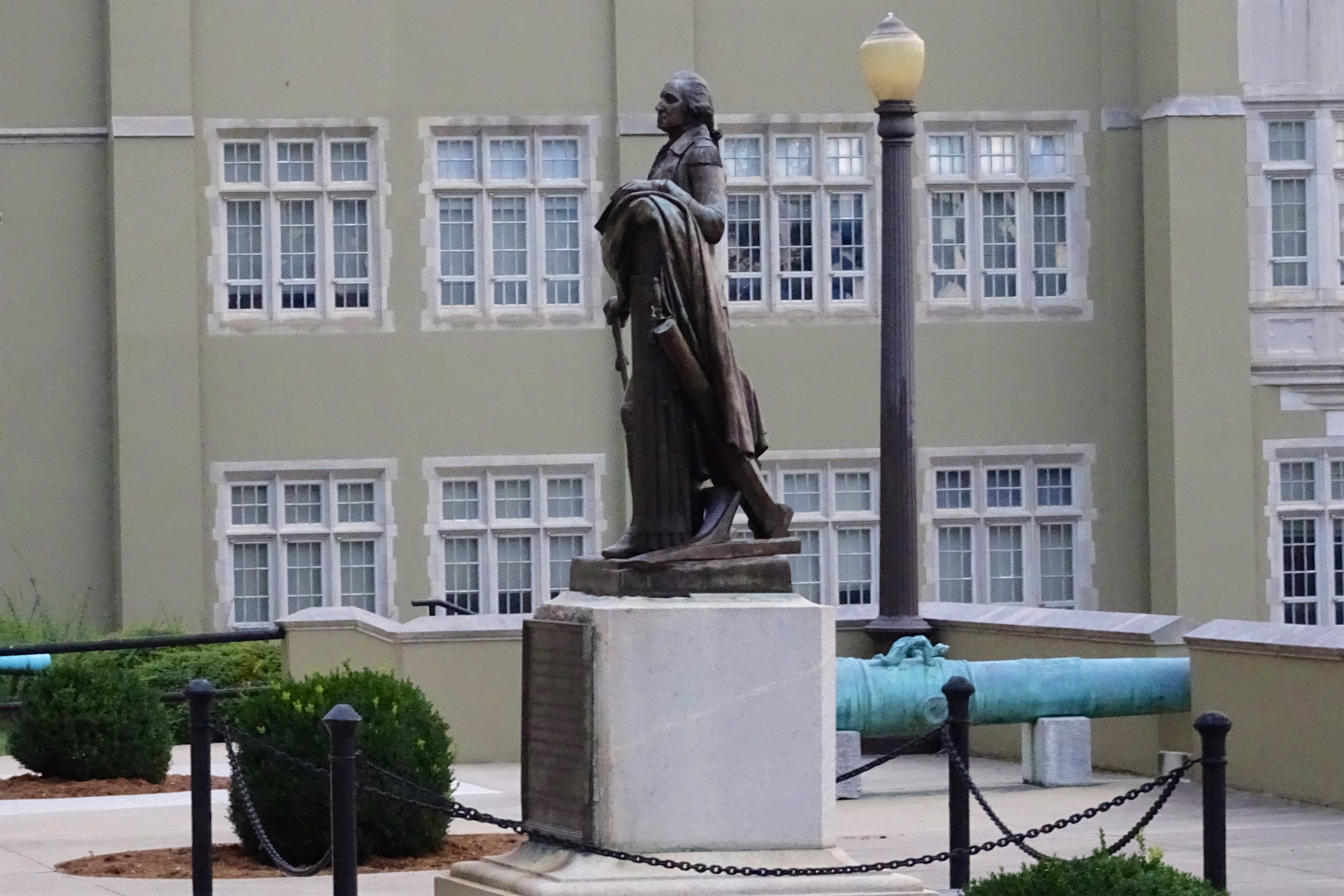
George Washington by Hubard after Houdon at the Virginia Military Institute

On January 14, 1853, he was given exclusive license by the Virginia General Assembly to make bronze copies of the marble statue of George Washington by French sculptor Jean-Antoine Houdon, producing them as of 1856, with a total of six in all.

In February 1862, he was killed in an accidental explosion while making munitions in Richmond for the Confederate States of America during the American Civil War.

Works by Hubard reside in the collections of Historic New England, the Smithsonian, and The Valentine in Richmond.

== Selected works ==
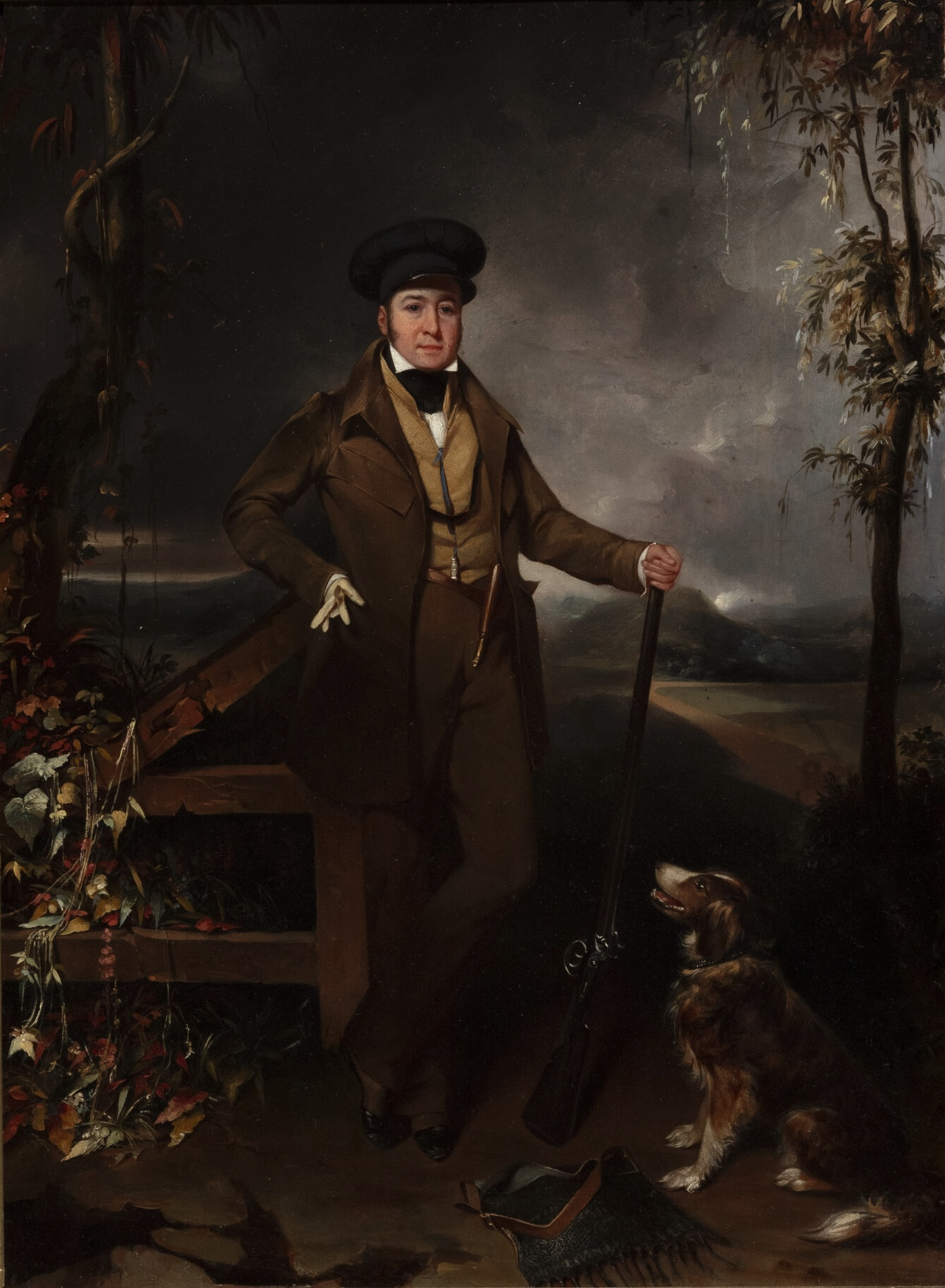
Portrait of John MacTavish, c. 1829–1832 (Maryland Center for History and Culture)

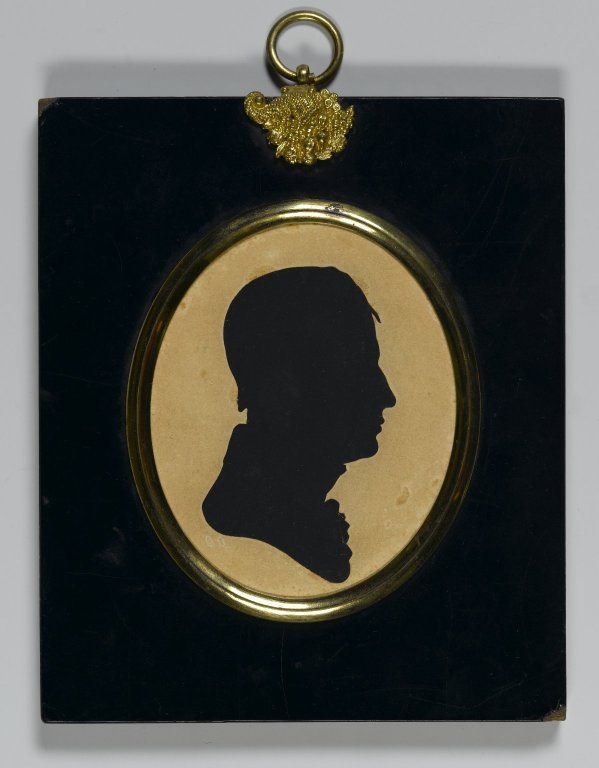
Profile of a man, 19th century (Brooklyn Museum)

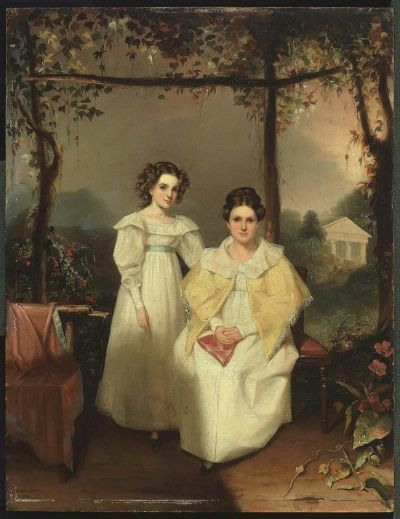
Margaret Oliver Colt and Mary Devereux Colt in the Gardens at "Green Mount," Baltimore, 1830 (Museum of Fine Arts, Boston)

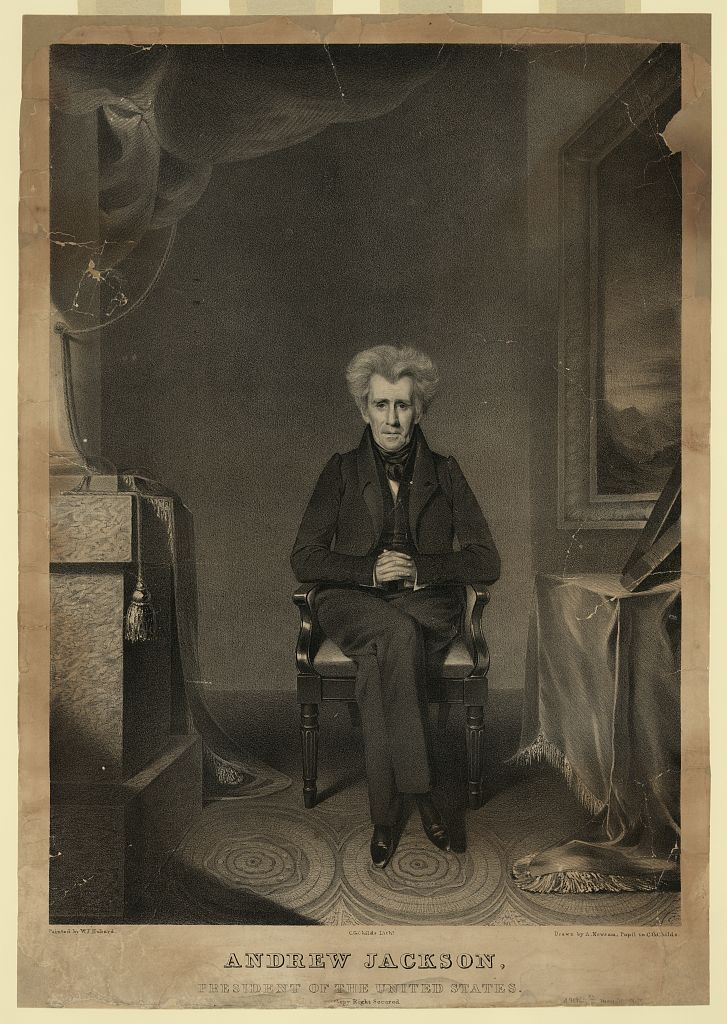
Portrait of Andrew Jackson, engraving after painting by Hubard, c. 1830s

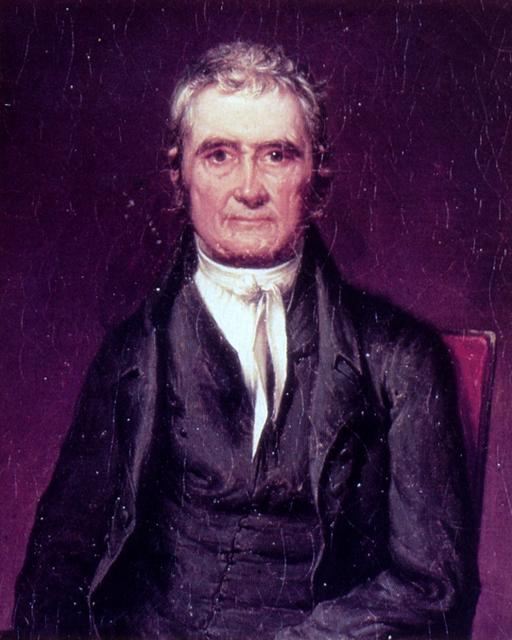
Portrait of John Marshall, c. 1832

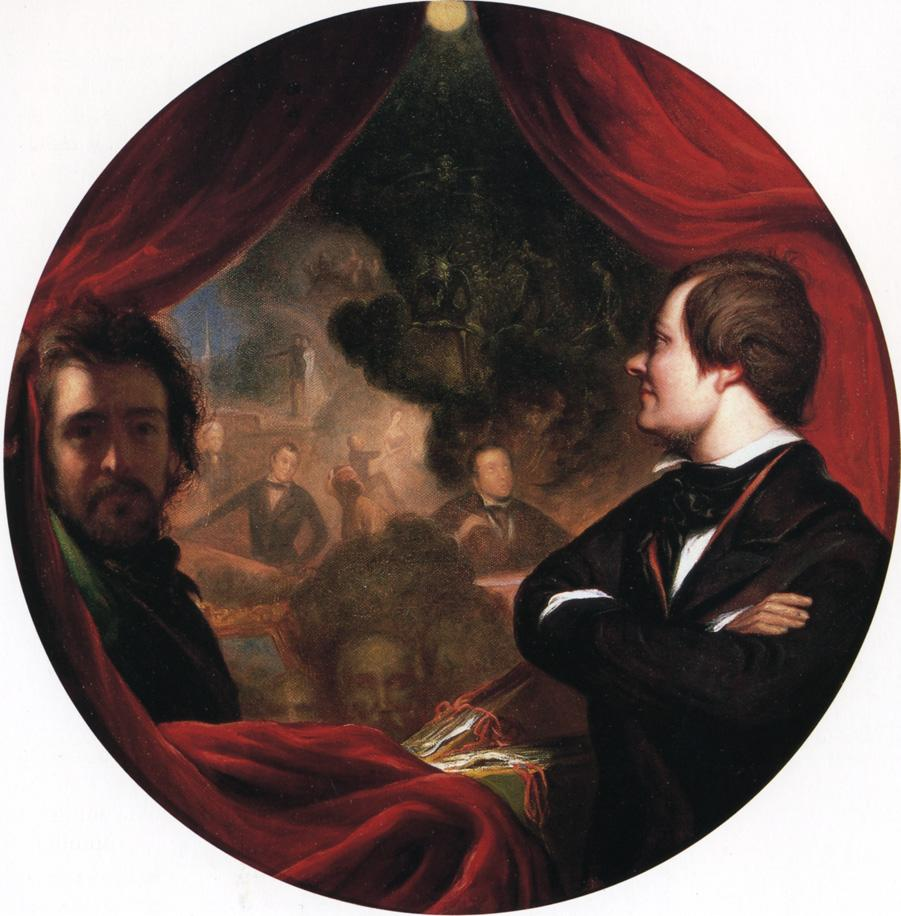
Mann S. Valentine and the Artist, 1852; the face of Hubard is visible at the left. (The Valentine, Richmond, VA)
