= Julien Hall (Boston) =

Coordinates: 42°21′23.5″N 71°3′22.35″W

Julien Hall (built 1825) was a building in Boston, Massachusetts, on the corner of Congress Street and Milk Street. It flourished 1825-1843, housing a variety of public events such as lectures by Red Jacket, William Lloyd Garrison; temperance meetings; political meetings; auctions; exhibitions of live animals, portraits by William James Hubard, John H. I. Browere; performances of the "automaton chess player" and the "panharmonicon;" and so on. By 1842 boxer John Sheridan had converted space in the hall into an athletic gymnasium.

The building was known as "Julien Hall" because it had been "built on the land where formerly stood the much noted Julien's Restorator." It was also called "Congress Hall." In 1828 it was described as "a large and convenient edifice ... erected in 1825, by Dr. Edward H. Robbins. ... There are two halls in this building, 55 by 44 feet square; the principal one is 15 feet high, and receives light through the cupola in the centre. These are rented for various purposes, such as public exhibitions, the holding of meetings, &c."

== Events at the Hall ==
- 1825
  - "Hubard Gallery" of William James Hubard, silhouette portrait artist (1825-1826). Also on display was John H.I. Browere's portrait bust of Gilbert Stuart
  - Panharmonicon
  - Oct. - Auction of "Russia goods" by J.L. Cunningham
  - Dec. 12 - City election, ward 8
- 1826
  - Automaton chess player, exhibited by Johann Nepomuk Maelzel
  - Nov. 28 - Meeting of supporters of mayor Josiah Quincy
- 1827
  - March 31 - Temperance meeting
  - Dec. 5 - Meeting of the Massachusetts Society for the Suppression of Intemperance
- 1829
  - April - "Red Jacket. The Indian chief whom Washington in 1792 pronounced 'the flower of the forest' has arrived in this city. ... On Tuesday next he intends to deliver a speech at Julien Hall, in his native tongue."
- 1830
  - April - Lectures by Robert L. Jennings, "a disciple of Owen, Wright & Co., of New York"
  - August - Exhibition of live snakes: "the anaconda, the boa constrictor, and the strangling serpents"
  - Oct. 15 - Lecture by William Lloyd Garrison
  - Abner Kneeland's "First Society of Free Enquirers" (ca.1830-1834)
  - "Robert Dale Owen, the platonic friend of Fanny Wright, is delivering a course of infidel lectures at the Julien Hall in Boston"
- 1831
  - Newtonian institute: "Courses of lectures will be given in English history, natural history of the animal kingdom, astronomy"
- 1833
  - July - "Wandering Piper"
- 1835
  - Jan. 21 - New-England Anti-Slavery Society 3rd annual meeting. "At the close of the meeting, the 'Colored Juvenile Choir, under the direction of Miss Paul,' sang "[s]everal hymns suited to the occasion" in the auditorium, which was 'crowded to suffocation.'"
  - May 20 - Theophilus Fisk, "Capital against Labor: an address delivered at Julien Hall before the mechanics of Boston." "The history of the producers of wealth, of the industrious classes, is that of a continual warfare of honesty against fraud, weakness against power, justice against oppression...."
  - July - Discussion "between the Rev. Mr. Gurley, agent of the Colonization Society and the Rev. Mr. May, an advocate for immediate emancipation"
  - August - Anti-Catholic lecture by M'Calla
  - Oct. -- "Abolition address" by George Thompson
  - Massachusetts Anti-Slavery Society meetings
- 1842
  - John Sheridan's Gymnasium, 1842-1843

== Images ==
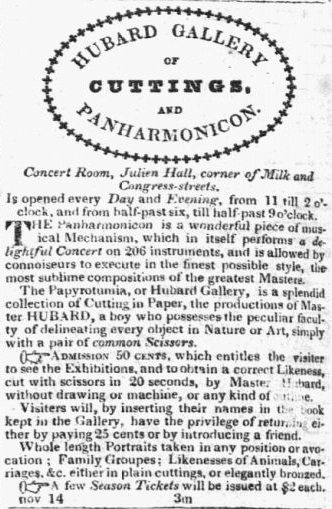
Advertisement for Hubard Gallery of Cuttings, and Panharmonicon, 1825

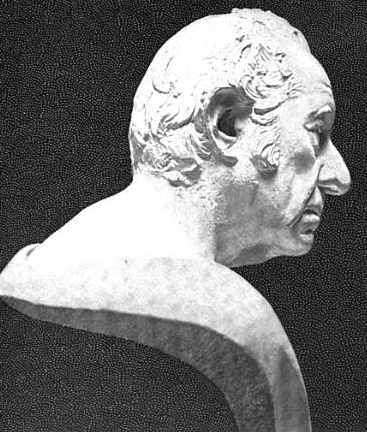
Browere's life mask portrait of artist Gilbert Stuart, ca.1825; displayed in the hall 1825

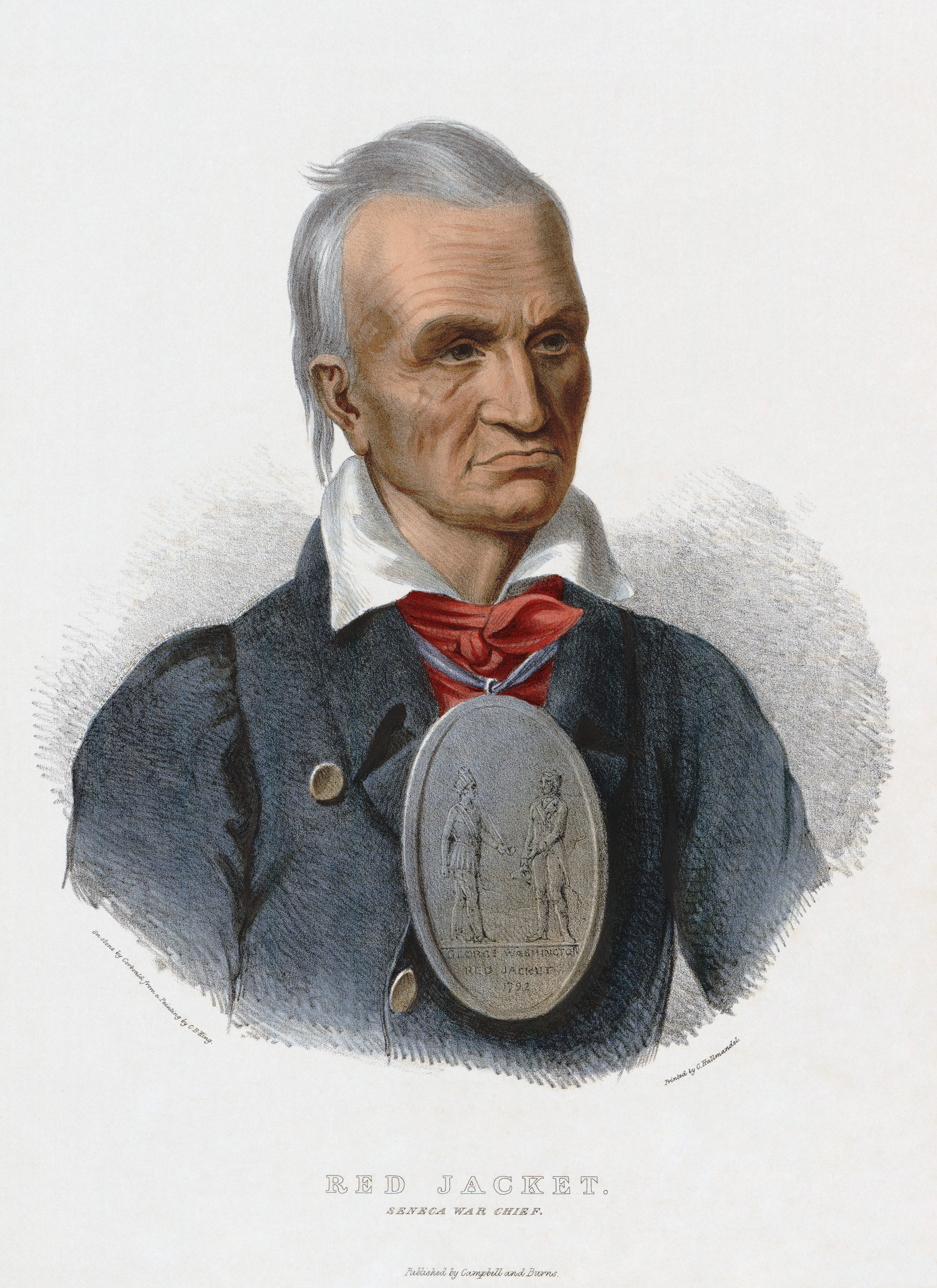
Portrait of Red Jacket, who spoke at Julien Hall, 1829

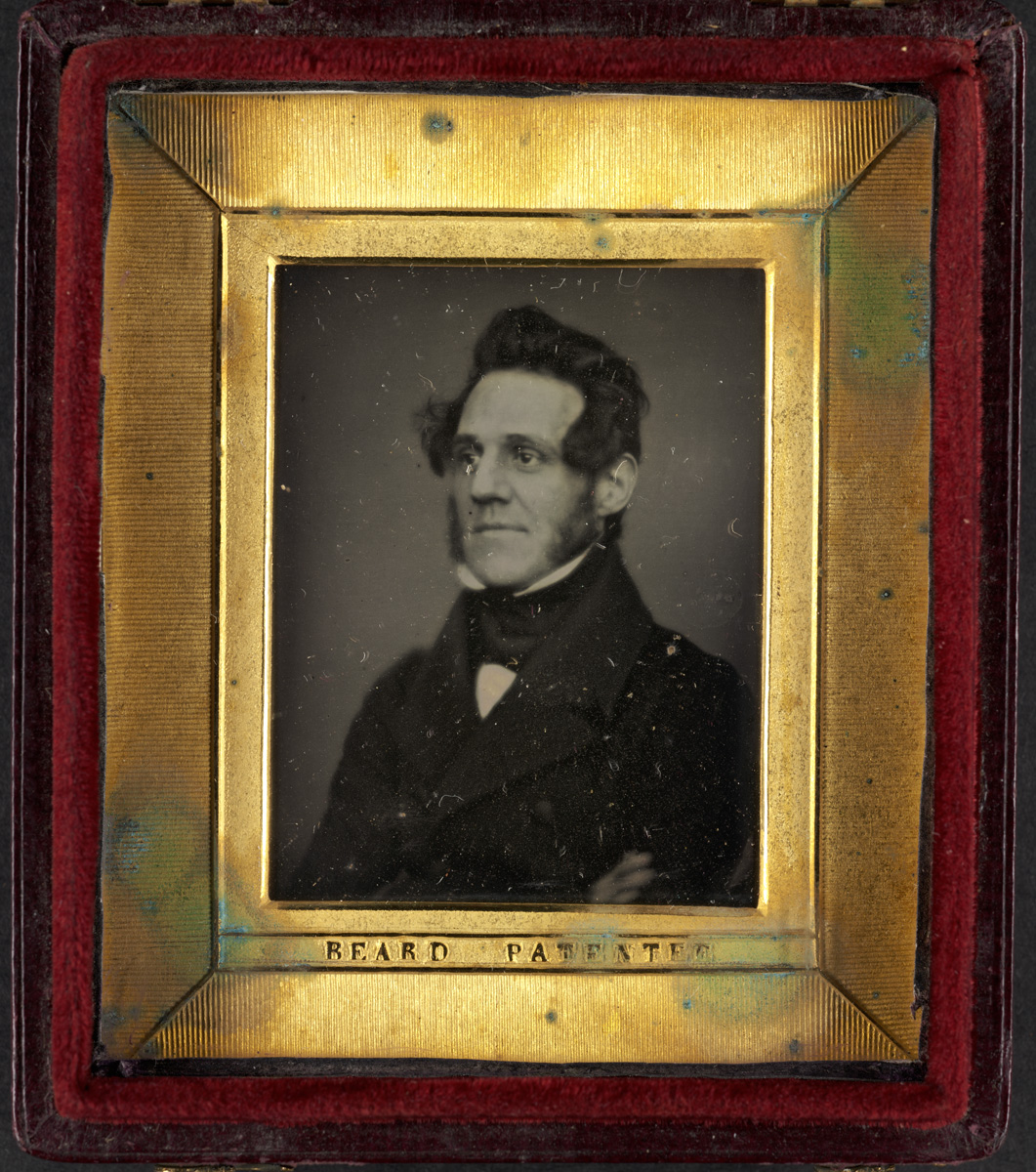
Portrait of George Thompson, who spoke at Julien Hall, 1835

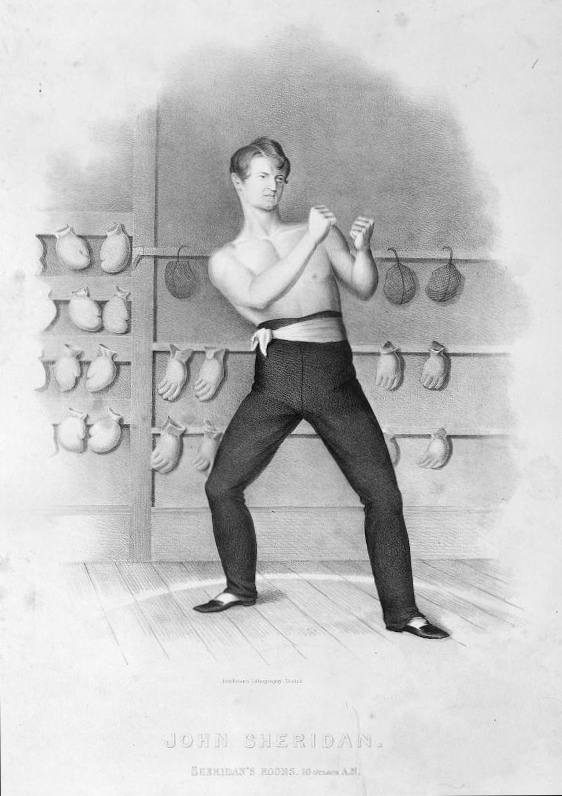
John Sheridan, proprietor of Sheridan's Gymnasium, 1842-1843
