= Milk Street (Boston) =

Street in Boston, Massachusetts

Coordinates: 42°21′26.53″N 71°03′16.45″W

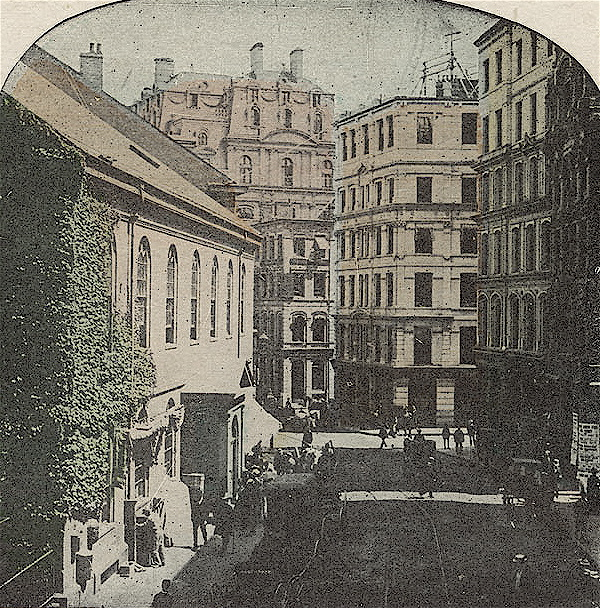
Milk Street in Boston in the 19th century

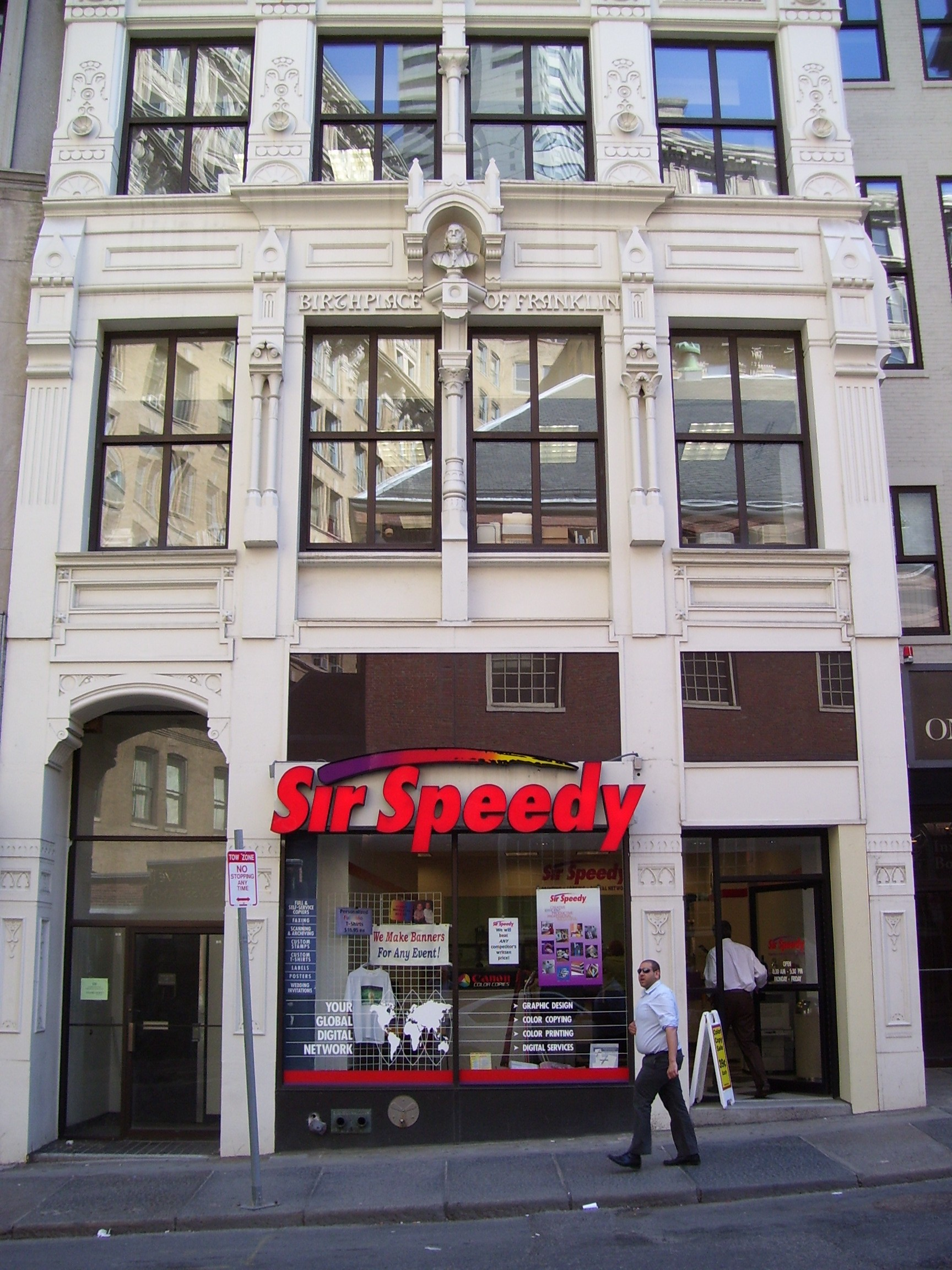
The birthplace of Benjamin Franklin across from Old South Meeting House on Milk Street is commemorated by a bust above the second floor facade of this building.

Milk Street is a street in the financial district of Boston, Massachusetts, which was one of Boston's earliest highways. The name "Milk Street" was most likely given to the street in 1708 due to a milk market at the location, although Grace Croft's 1952 work "History and Genealogy of Milk Family" instead proposes that Milk Street may have been named for John Milk, an early shipwright in Boston. The land was originally conveyed to his father, also John Milk, in October 1666.

One of the first post offices in Boston was founded on the street in 1711, when the first regular postal routes to Maine, Plymouth and New York were established.

== Buildings on Milk Street ==
- Old South Meeting House at the corner of Milk and Washington where Milk Street begins
- Central Wharf and its warehouses, and the New England Aquarium, at the waterfront end of Milk Street
- Flour and Grain Exchange Building at Milk and India streets
- The King Building at 120 Milk Street, built 1894 as a bank and now an apartment building
- International Trust Company Building, built 1892–1893, at 39–47 Milk Street
- The John W. McCormack Post Office and Courthouse occupies a block bounded on one side by Milk Street, which also defines one side of Post Office Square and the block occupied by the One Post Office Square skyscraper

== Historical places and former residents ==
- Benjamin Franklin's birthplace is on Milk Street.
- Boston's historical Newspaper Row district includes 5–23 Milk Street. The defunct Boston Post newspaper was headquartered at 15–17 Milk Street.
- The United States Post Office and Sub-Treasury Building, demolished 1929, now the site of the John W. McCormack Post Office and Courthouse
- Julien's Restorator, a pioneering late-18th- and early-19th-century restaurant, was at Milk Street and Congress Street. Julien Hall, now demolished, was built on the site in 1825.
- J. L. Cunningham, auctioneer, worked in Corinthian Hall at Milk Street and Federal Street, 1826–1843.
- Benjamin Dearborn, mechanical inventor, lived on Milk Street.
- Abram French ran a crockery business on Milk Street in the 19th century.
- David Claypoole Johnston, artist, kept a studio on Milk Street in the 19th century.
- Nineteenth-century engraver Ephraim W. Bouvé's studio was on Milk Street.
- Instrument-maker Thomas Appleton (1785–1872), partner of Alpheus Babcock, had his workshops at 6 Milk Street; and a successor company, the Franklin Music Warehouse, was also on Milk Street.
- The American Humane Education Society, publisher of Black Beauty and Strike at Shane’s, had headquarters at 45 Milk Street.

== Subway connection ==
The closest subway stop to Milk Street is State station.

== Images ==
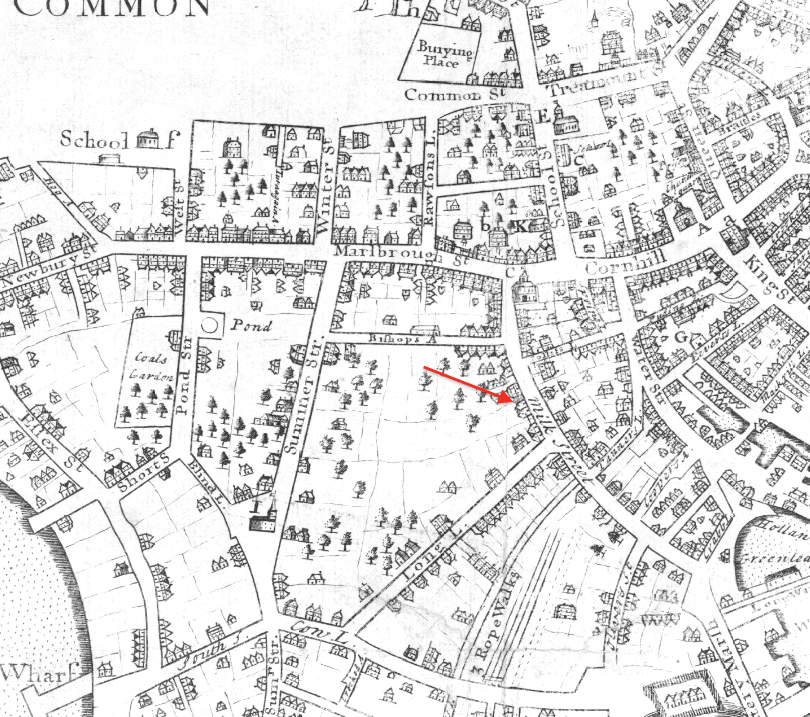
1723 map of Boston, showing Milk St. and vicinity

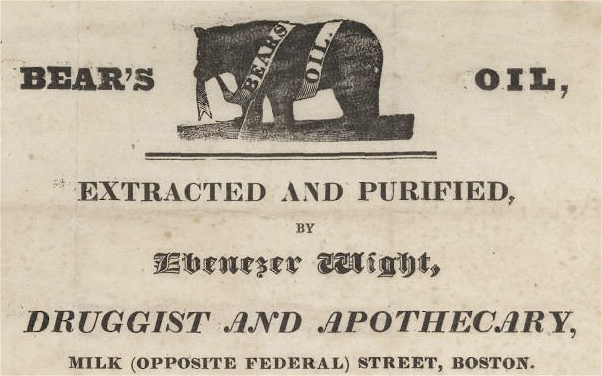
Apothecary, Milk St., c. 1825

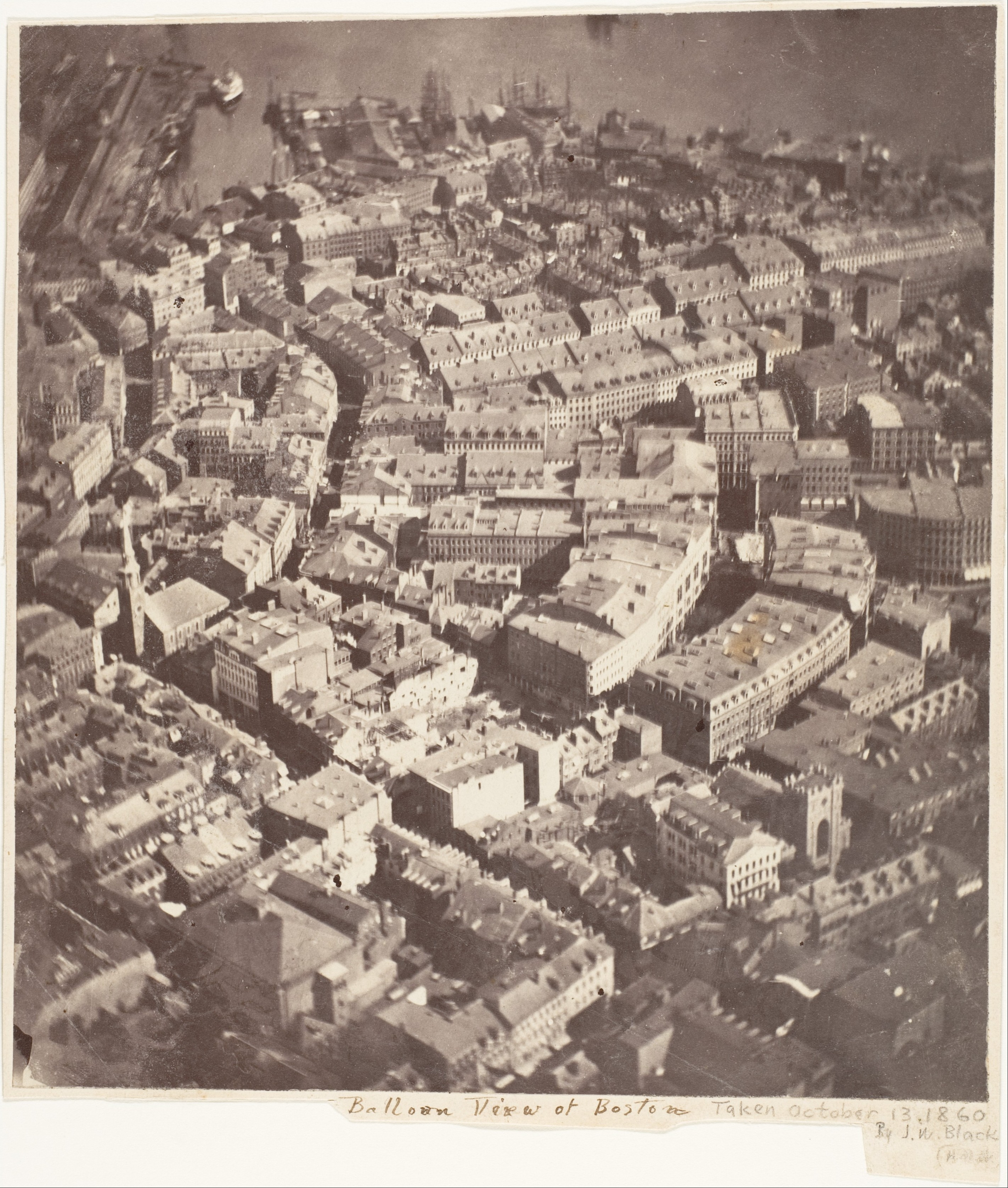
Boston, as the Eagle and the Wild Goose See It, 1860 overview photo by J.W. Black, showing Milk Street and vicinity
