= United States Post Office and Sub-Treasury Building (Boston) =

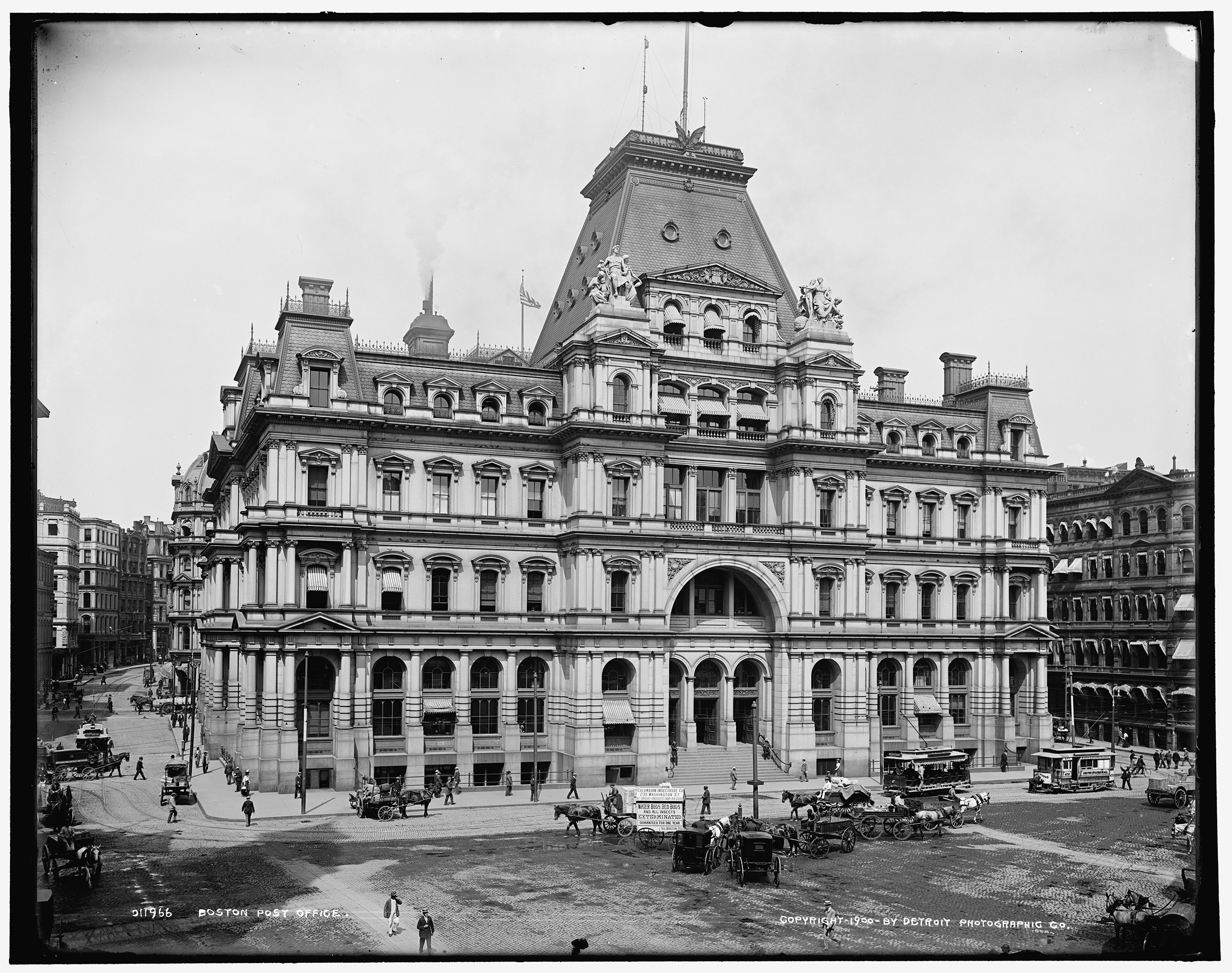
- The Post Office and Sub-Treasury Building from across Post Office Square, c. 1900
- Interactive map of the United States Post Office and Sub-Treasury Building area

General information
- Architectural style: Second Empire
- Location: Post Office Square, Boston, Massachusetts
- Coordinates: 42.357222°N 71.056944°W
- Construction started: 1869
- Completed: 1885
- Demolished: 1929

Height
- Height: 126 ft (38 m)

Technical details
- Floor area: 51,372 sq ft (4,772.6 m^{2})

Design and construction
- Architects: Alfred B. Mullett; William Appleton Potter

The United States Post Office and Sub-Treasury Building (demolished 1929) was a public building on Post Office Square in Boston, Massachusetts. Built in the late nineteenth century, it was the first post office building in the city to be owned by the United States federal government. The John W. McCormack Post Office and Courthouse now stands on its former site.

== History ==
The Post Office and Sub-Treasury Building was designed to provide a permanent Boston office for the United States Postal Service, which had spent the early part of the nineteenth century repeatedly moving between various downtown locations in the city. Efforts to build a proper post office building in Boston had begun during the administration of President Millard Fillmore, but these met with little success until 1867, when Andrew Johnson approved a joint resolution by the United States Congress for appointing a commission to determine a site for the structure. In 1868 a site was selected and Congress made an appropriation for purchase of the land, and groundbreaking took place in the following year. The ceremony for laying the cornerstone took place in 1871, by which time the first floor of the building was already nearly complete, and was attended by President Ulysses S. Grant and members of the United States Cabinet.

Construction of the building was temporarily interrupted by the Great Boston Fire of November 9-10, 1872, which destroyed a significant portion of downtown Boston. The still-incomplete building, which stood at the very edge of the burnt district, survived due to the use of fireproof materials during development, but suffered $175,000 of damages as a result of the blaze. Soon afterward, the government bought up several adjacent plots destroyed by the fire and decided to undertake a significant expansion of the structure, increasing its size to the entire block between Milk, Congress, Water and Devonshire Streets. The originally-planned portion of the building was completed in late 1874, and the postal service moved there from its temporary headquarters in the Old South Meeting House on December 19. At the same time, an open space on Congress Street side of the building, formed by the expansion of the city streets in the aftermath of the fire, was named Post Office Square in recognition of the new structure. Construction of the expansion phase took several more years and only ended in 1885, by which time the total cost of the building had exceeded $6 million.

The completed building was designed by Supervising Architect Alfred B. Mullett and revised by William Appleton Potter, with architect Alexander Rice Esty serving as Supervisor of Construction (from 1876-1881). It was built in the Second Empire style with Cape Ann granite and a prominent Mansard roof. Similar in appearance to both Old City Hall and the later Suffolk County Courthouse, it became one of several edifices that made Post Office Square a center of Victorian architecture in the late nineteenth century. The first floor of the building was largely occupied by the postal service, while the upper stories were taken up by various other federal agencies and officials, including the Bureau of Internal Revenue, United States Lighthouse Board and the Signal Service. The third floor acted as the home of the United States circuit and district courts for Massachusetts.

By the early twentieth century, the space requirements of the federal government had outgrown the existing building, which had also become an object of derision in the face of a modernist backlash against Second Empire architecture. Following the passage of the Public Buildings Act in 1926, a campaign began for the building to be replaced with a larger and more modern structure. An appropriation for the project was filed in 1927 and approved, and in 1928 the various federal agencies moved out of the building. In the following year it was demolished, and four years later it was replaced with the new United States Post Office, Courthouse, and Federal Building.

Two large statuaries by Daniel Chester French which formerly stood on top of the building are now located in Franklin Park. These were preserved during the demolition and were subsequently gifted to the city of Boston.

== Images ==
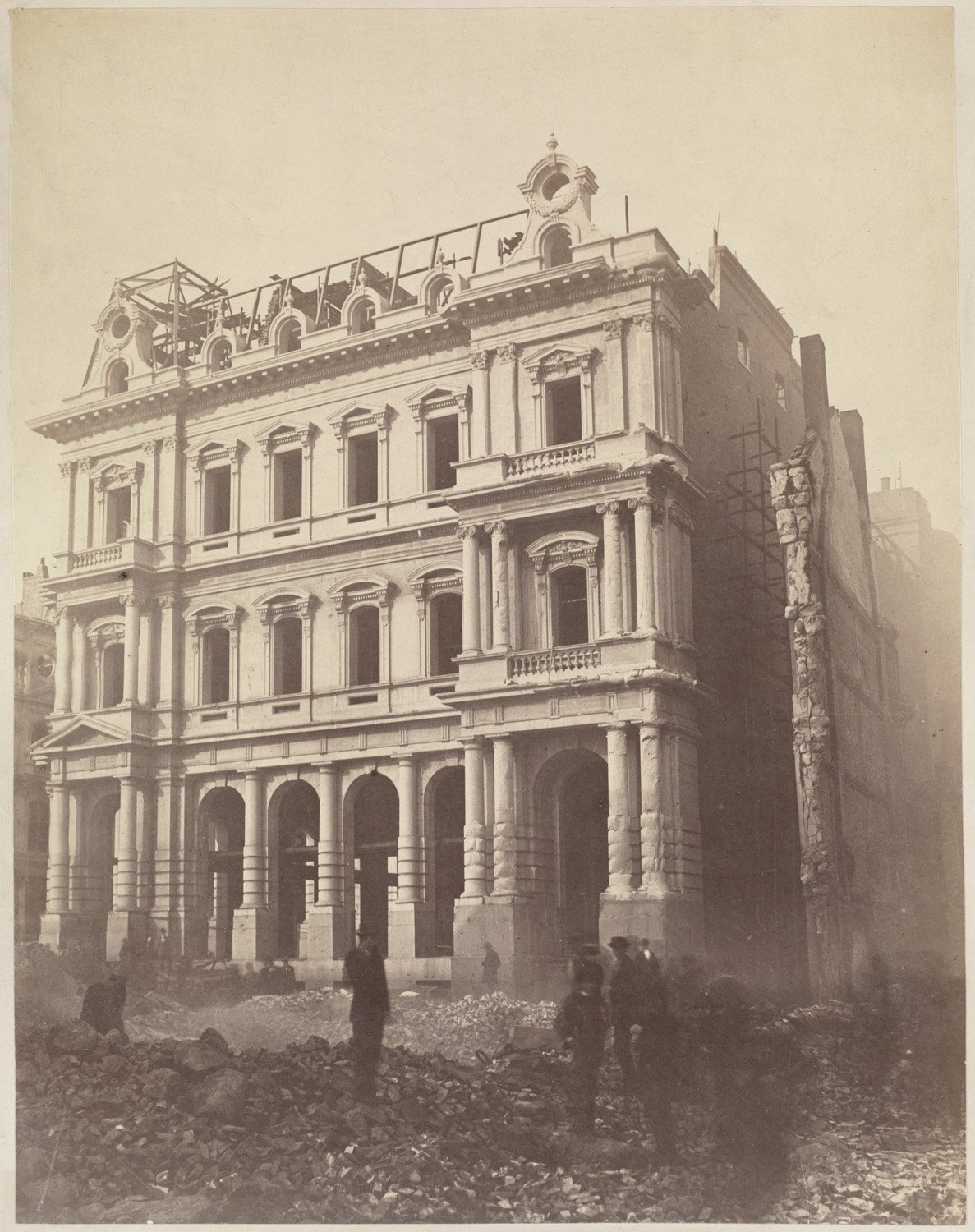
The uncompleted post office building amidst the ruins of the Great Boston Fire, 1872

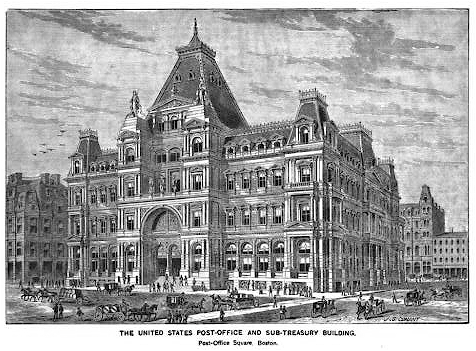
Depiction of the post office, 1881

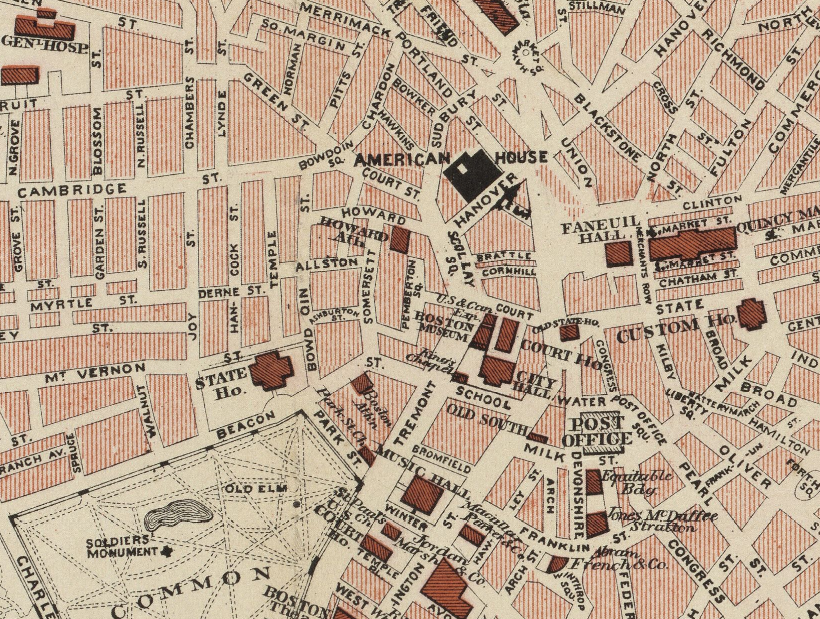
Map of Post Office Square, 1883
