= Postplatz =

Postplatz (Post Office Square) may refer to:

- Postplatz (Dresden)
- Zug Postplatz railway station

== See also ==
- Post Office Square (disambiguation)
