= Post Office Square =

Post Office Square may refer to:

- Post Office Square, Boston, Massachusetts, US
- Post Office Square, Brisbane, Queensland, Australia
- Post Office Square, Wellington, New Zealand

== See also ==
- Postplatz (disambiguation), in German
