= Julien's Restorator =

Coordinates: 42°21′23.5″N 71°3′22.35″W

Restaurant information
- Established: 1793
- Closed: 1823
- Previous owner: Jean Baptiste Gilbert Payplat dis Julien
- Location: Boston, Massachusetts, United States

Julien's Restorator (1793–1823) was a restaurant in Boston, Massachusetts, established by French-born Jean Baptiste Gilbert Payplat dis Julien. It was one of the first restaurants in Boston; previous public eating-rooms were in "taverns or boarding houses."

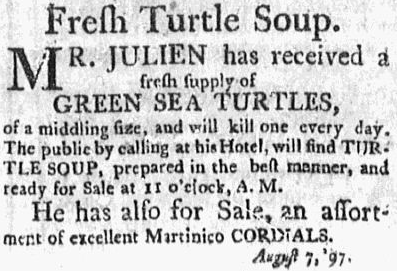
Advertisement for turtle soup, Julien's Restorator, Boston, 1797

== History ==
Julien moved to the United States "as cook to the celebrated Dubuque, who was a refugee from the French Revolution." Prior to 1793, Julien had served as "steward to the Hon. M. LeTombe, consul of the French Republic." Other friends and associates included Jean Anthelme Brillat-Savarin.

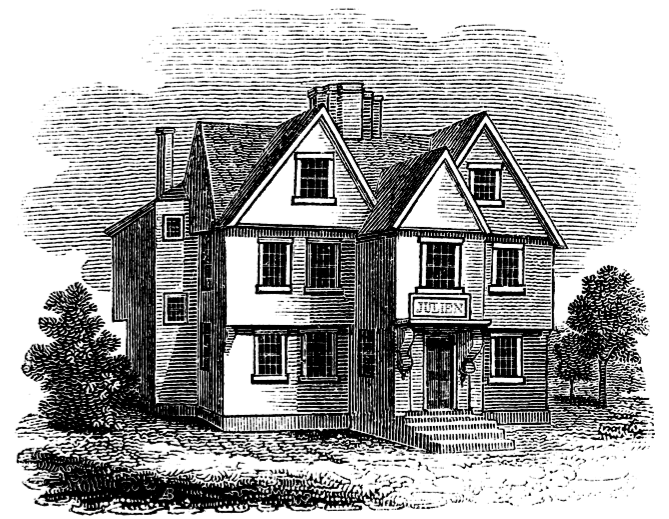
The Restorator, Milk Street, Boston, 1794-1824

The Restorator opened in July 1793: "a resort where the infirm in health, the convalescent, and those whose attention to studious business occasions a lassitude of nature; can obtain the most suitable nourishment. ... Spirits are not to be used; ... and all gaming is disallowed. ... Excellent wines and cordials, good soups and broths, pastry in all its delicious variety, alamode beef, bacon, poultry, and generally, all other refreshing viands, will be kept in due preparation: and a bill of fare will be kept ... from which each visitor may command whatever may best suit his appetite."

The business first stood on Congress Street "opposite the Quaker's meeting house" in the Financial District, then in 1794 settled on Milk Street (corner of Congress St.) in "the house lately occupied by Mr. Thomas Clements." The building had been erected in 1670-1671 by Henry Bridgham. Julien's was "agreeably situated to receive the fresh air -- which is so necessary for the convalescent and strangers." The establishment was referred to as "Julien's," the "Boston Restorator," "Mr. Julien's French Restorator," "Julien's Restorator," or "The Restorator."

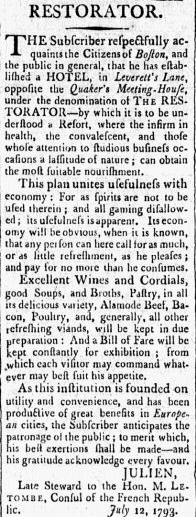
Advertisement for The Restorator, Boston, 1793

According to food historians Julien's "public eating house ... was famous for his soups and stews, and he was nicknamed the 'Prince of Soups.' He is credited with introducing to America the julienne soup, a composition of vegetables in long, narrow strips. Julien specialized in making turtle soup." Julien's advertisements for the soup emphasized medical justifications: "Turtle soup. Much has been said on its efficacy in purifying the blood by Tissot in his celebrated dissertation on the subject, and by Buffon, the great naturalist, who discovered the beneficial nature of amphibious animals. Those who use this soup must not expect that it be made strong with spice, but from ingredients clear and light." "Many celebrated physicians have recommended it. ... As the first establishment of a restorator in Paris was not for Epicurians -- but for the benefit of those invalids who stood in need of light substance, nourishing and strengthening to their stomacks, it was recommended for the purpose by the Academy in Paris. Citizens of the above description are invited to call and try the virtue of Julien's turtle soup." Julien stressed the healthiness of other items available to his patrons, such as "Naples cordials, syrup of vinegar, syrup of orgeat, and white Bourdeaux wine, all of which are calculated for strengthening and invigorating the system of nature during the heat of summer."

The particulars of Julien's style of business and its inspiration to competitors resonated culturally, for example in a literary spoof in the New England Palladium newspaper, 1801:

In imitation of Mr. Julien, I mean to open a house of public entertainment, where every intellectual epicure may be gratified with his favourite dish. The moralist shall be feasted with ethics, the philologist with criticism, and the weak and delicate palates of beaus and ladies shall be indulged with remarks on dress and fashion. After the sumptuous repasts afforded by the Tatler, Spectator, Guardian, Rambler, &c. every succeeding candidate for public favour, in this province, must appear to disadvantage; nor have I the presumption to imagine, that I can produce any thing which can vie, in point of excellence, with the choice dishes of those able caterers. But as the situation and habits of the new world differ considerably from those of the old, if I should be so fortunate as to hit the taste of my customers, I shall have no mean opinion of my cookery. ...

Events that took place at the Restorator included a July 4th dinner of the "officers of the first regiment" in 1798; and anniversary celebrations of the Boston Franklin Typographical Association, 1803–1805.

Julien died in 1805, and was buried in the Central Burying Ground. His wife Hannah Julien continued at the Restorator through at least 1813. Around 1816 it was "continued under the management of a countryman of Mr. Julien," Frederick Rouillard, until 1823. The building was demolished in 1824, and in 1825 Edward H. Robbins built on the old site of the Restorator a multi-functional assembly space, Julien Hall, named in honor of the now-defunct restaurant.
