= Congress Street Bridge (Boston) =

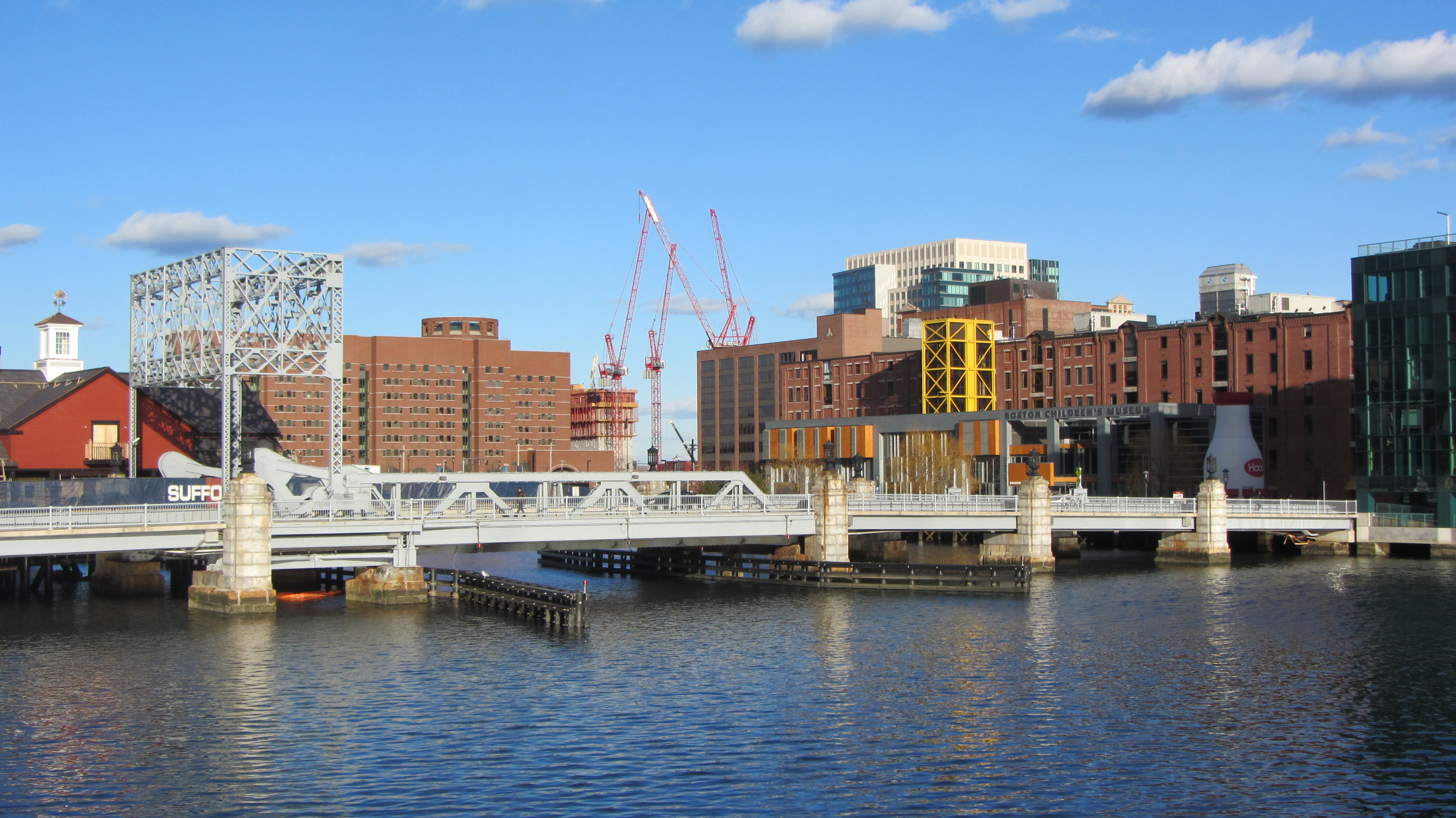
- The bridge in 2012
- Coordinates: 42.35190°N 71.05118°W
- Carries: Congress Street
- Crosses: Fort Point Channel
- Locale: Boston, Massachusetts, U.S.
- Official name: Congress Street Bascule Bridge
- Owner: City of Boston
- Maintained by: Boston Public Works

Characteristics
- Design: Trunnion bascule bridge
- Material: Steel, concrete, granite
- Total length: 561 feet (171 m)
- Width: 65 feet (20 m)
- Height: 53 feet (16 m) (above deck)
- Longest span: 91 feet (28 m) (bascule)
- No. of spans: 9
- Piers in water: 8
- Clearance below: 6 feet (1.8 m) (closed) unlimited (open)
- No. of lanes: 2 (formerly 4)

History
- Architect: Henri Desmond & Israel Lord
- Designer: Strauss Bascule Bridge Company
- Constructed by: Boston Bridge Works
- Built: 1930 – January 1931
- Replaces: 1874 swing bridge

Location
- Interactive map of Congress Street Bridge

The Congress Street Bridge is a bascule bridge in Boston, Massachusetts. It carries Congress Street across the Fort Point Channel, from the city's Financial District to South Boston. The bridge is well-known to tourists due to the Boston Tea Party Ships & Museum being located near the mid-point of the crossing, accessible via a sidewalk.

== History ==
Boston's Congress Street was extended across Fort Point Channel in 1874 by way of a swing bridge. The fixed portion was paved with cobblestones and included shelters for waiting pedestrians.

Boston mayor James Michael Curley announced a new "Bridge of Steel" for Congress Street in November 1929 and the first bridge was removed. The current bascule bridge was built in 1930. The patented design featured trunnions and job-creating embellishments like decorative granite piers holding giant lighting globes. Engineer Joseph Strauss also architected the Golden Gate Bridge. The new Congress Street Bridge was deemed complete on January 6, 1931, with a reported cost of $765,041 ($16.2 million in 2025). The lifting section of the bridge has been welded shut since the 1970s. A water main built above-water next to the second bridge was removed when it was renovated in the summer of 2004.

Notable attractions in the area include Boston Children's Museum and the Hood Milk Bottle, located at the east end of the bridge, and the Boston Tea Party Ships & Museum, located near the center of the bridge. The Tea Party museum, which first opened during the 200th anniversary of the event in 1973, originally occupied what had been the bridge tender's house. The museum's gift shop burned in a fire on August 3, 2001, which was late attributed to a lightning strike. The facility remained closed, and another fire on August 27, 2007, consumed the main building. That fire was accidentally ignited by sparks from welders working on the Congress Street Bridge. A new structure was subsequently built for the Tea Party museum, which opened in June 2012.

== Gallery ==
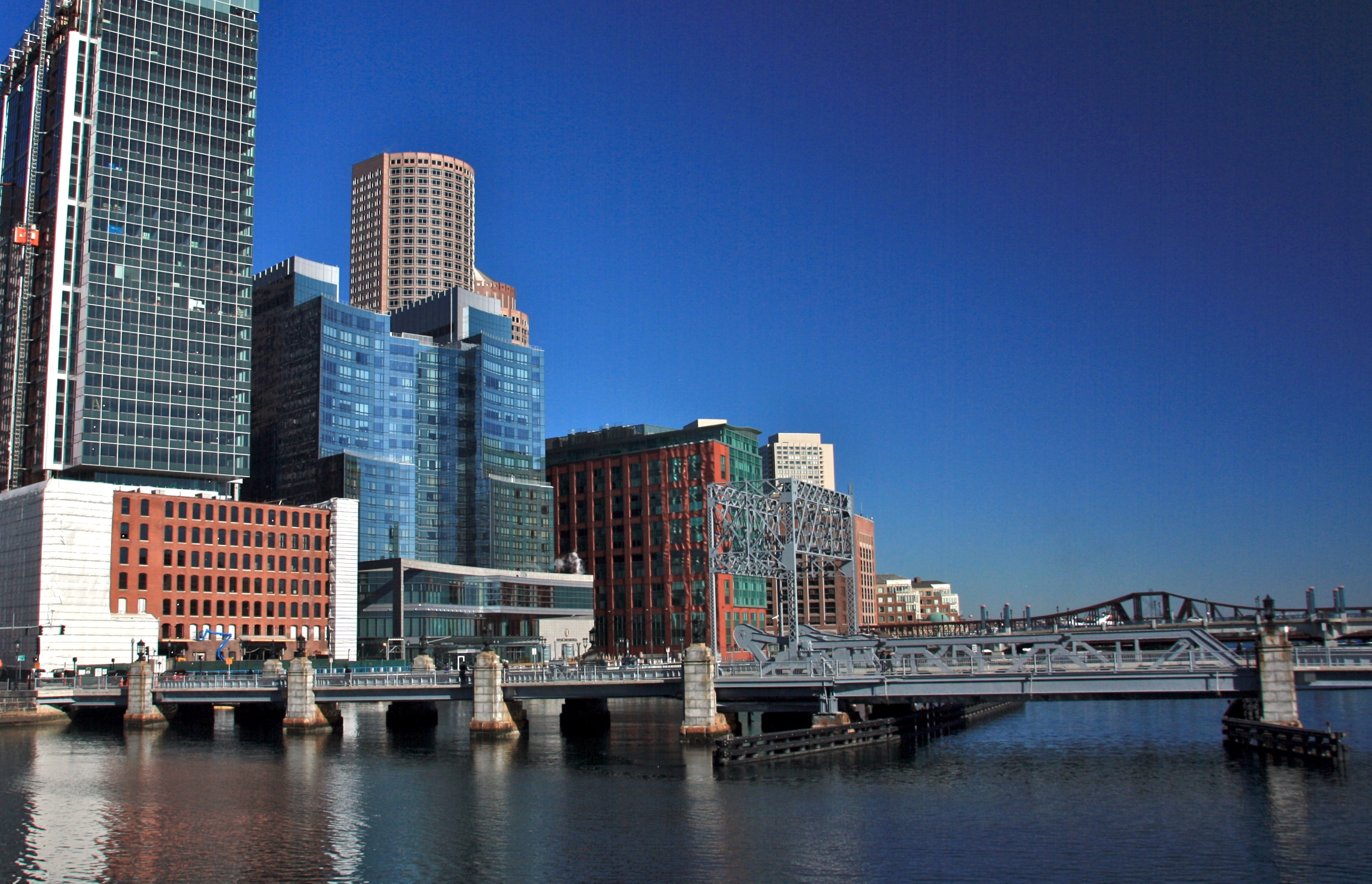
The bridge in 2010, looking towards Downtown Boston

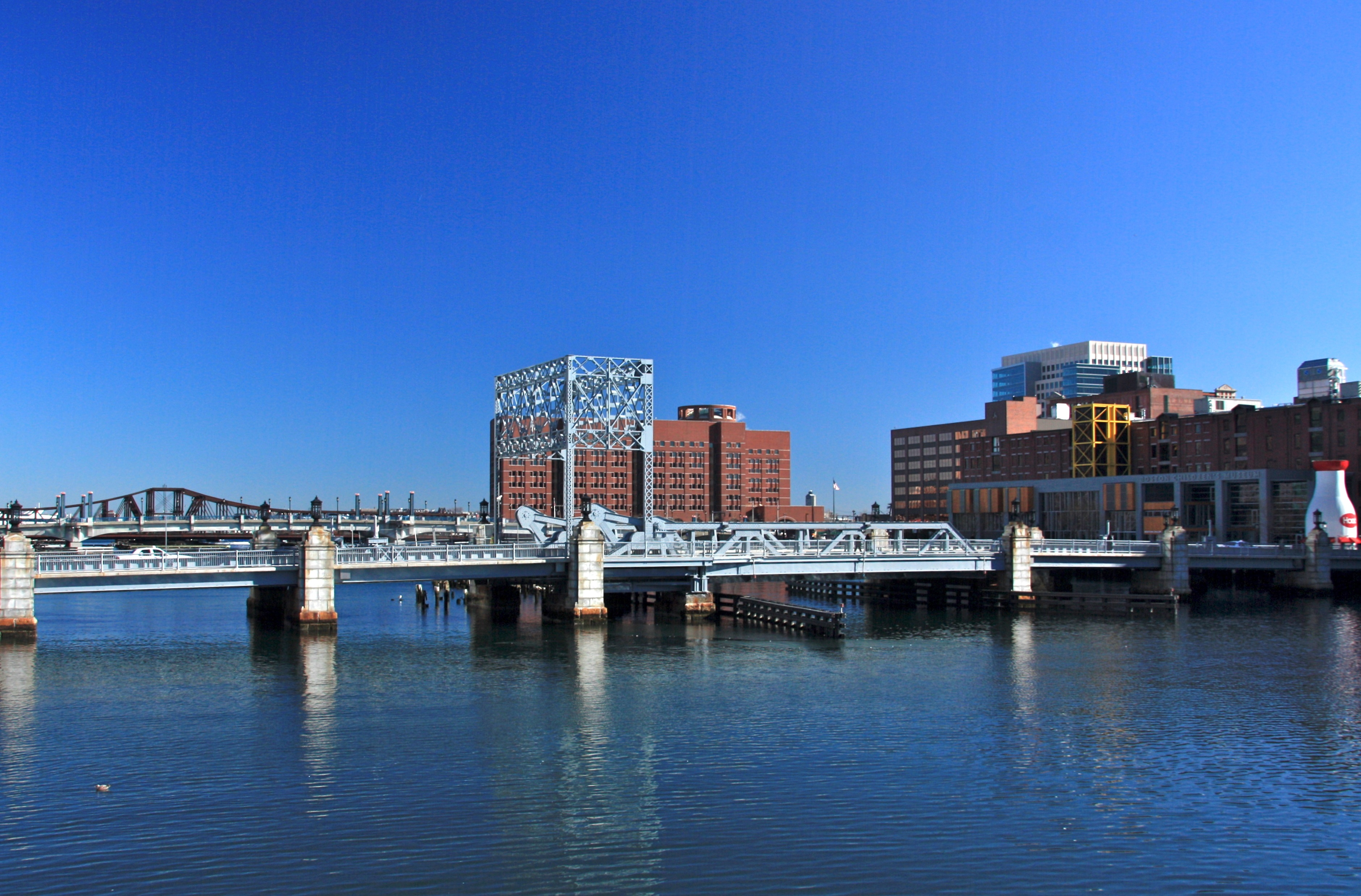
The bridge in 2010, looking towards South Boston

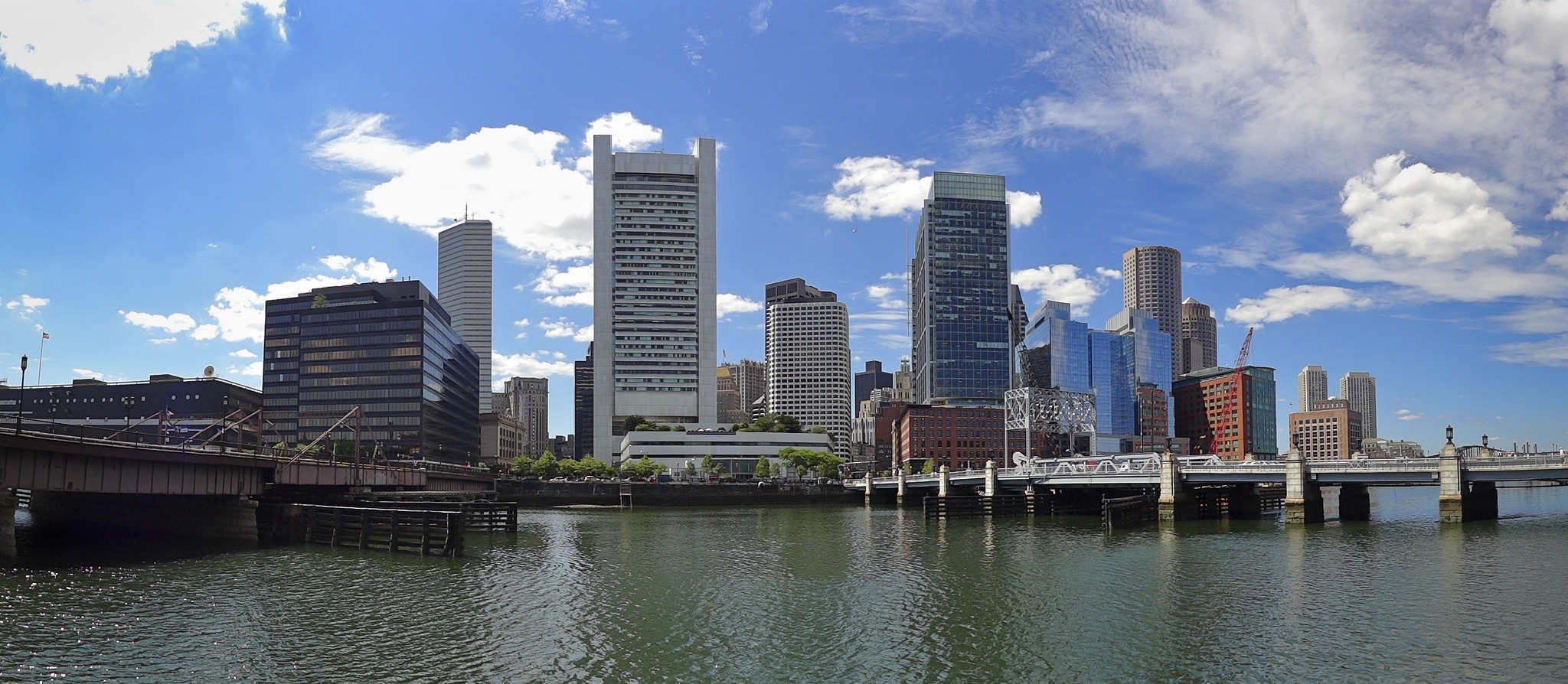
The bridge in 2011; the Summer Street Bridge is visible at left

== See also ==
- List of bridges documented by the Historic American Engineering Record in Massachusetts
