= Post Office Square, Boston =

Square in Boston, Massachusetts

Post Office Square
- Square in Boston
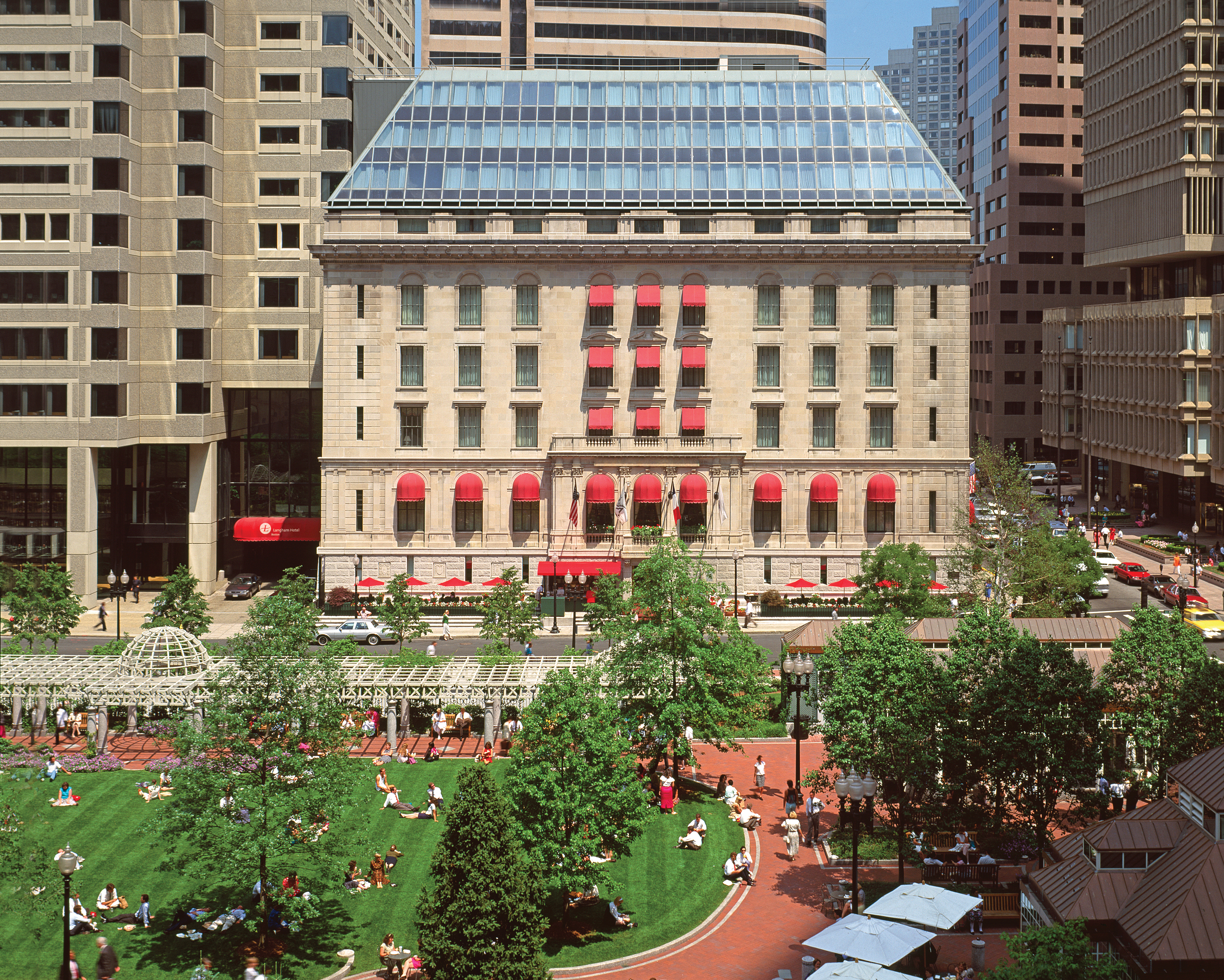
- The Langham Hotel is situated along the northeastern edge of the square. Norman B. Leventhal park is also visible in the foreground.
- Features: Norman B. Leventhal park
- Location: Financial District, Boston, Massachusetts, United States
- Intersection: Franklin Street, Congress Street, Milk Street, Pearl Street
- Interactive map of Post Office Square
- Coordinates: 42.356260°N 71.055707°W

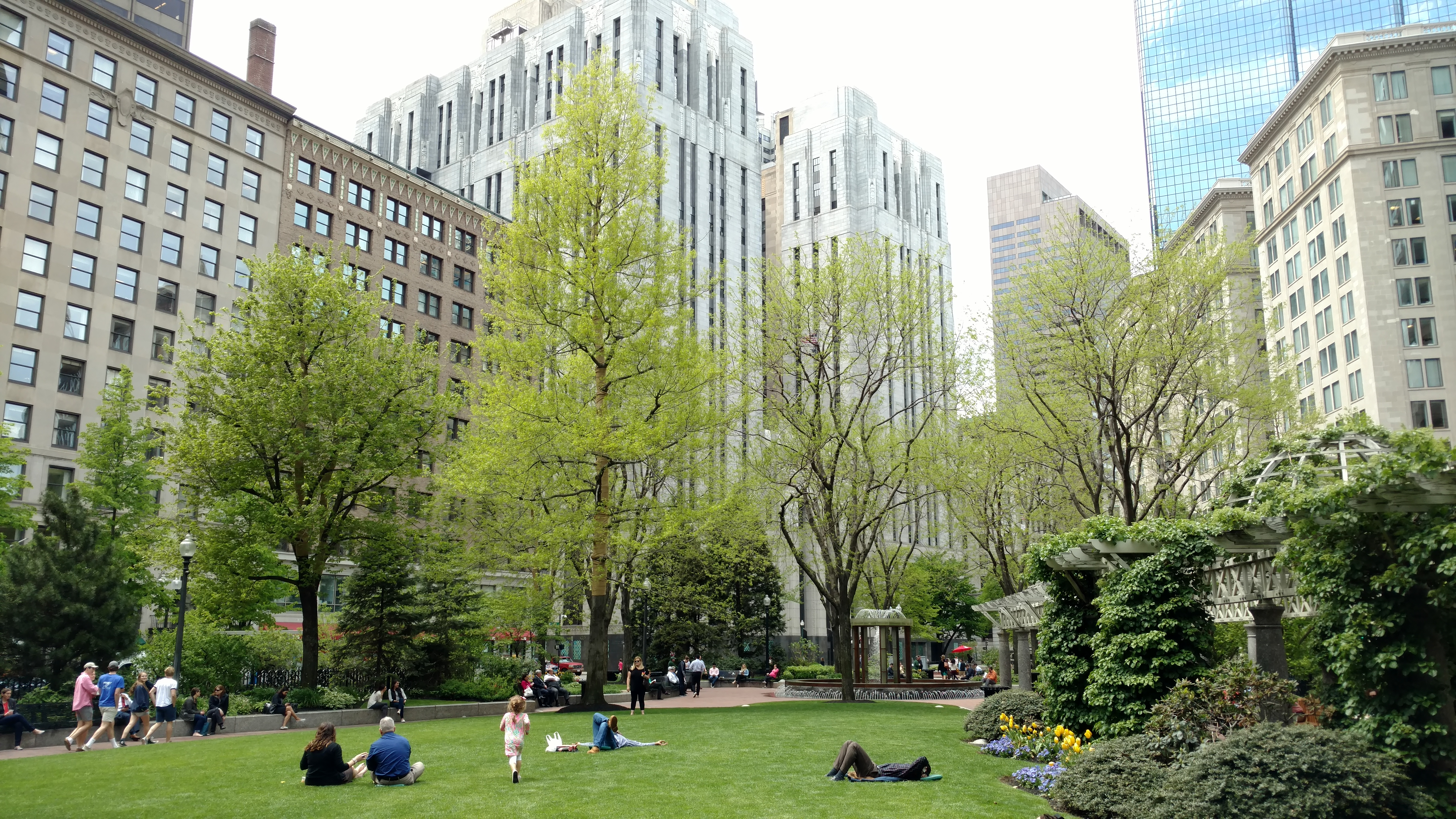
Post Office Square is a popular lunchtime destination for workers in Boston's Financial District

Post Office Square (est. 1874) in Boston, Massachusetts, is a square located in the financial district at the intersection of Milk, Congress, Pearl and Water Streets. It was named in 1874 after the United States Post Office and Sub-Treasury which fronted it, now replaced by the John W. McCormack Post Office and Courthouse.

The square is almost entirely occupied by a privately owned and managed but publicly accessible park, Norman B. Leventhal Park, named for the Boston building manager and designer who designed it. It sits above a parking garage, named "The Garage at Post Office Square." The garage descends to 80 feet (24 m) below the surface, at the time one of the deepest points of excavation in the city. Revenues from parking fund the maintenance of the park. The 1.7-acre (0.69 ha) park is a popular lunchtime destination for area workers. It features a café, fountains, and a pergola around a central lawn, and the management provides seat cushions for visitors during the summer. Designed by landscape architects The Halvorson Company in collaboration with Ellenzweig Architects, the park is also home to "125 species of plants."

== History ==
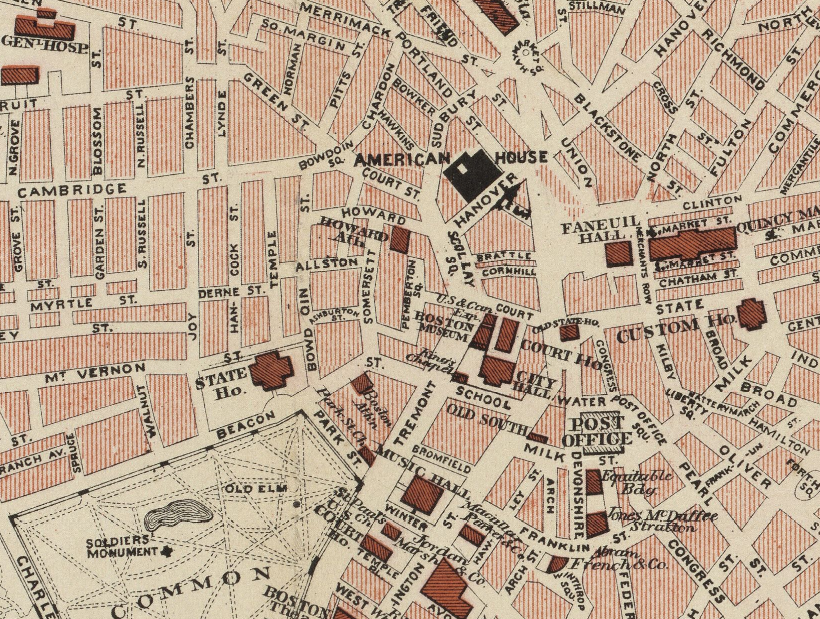
Detail of 1883 map of Boston, showing Post Office Square and vicinity

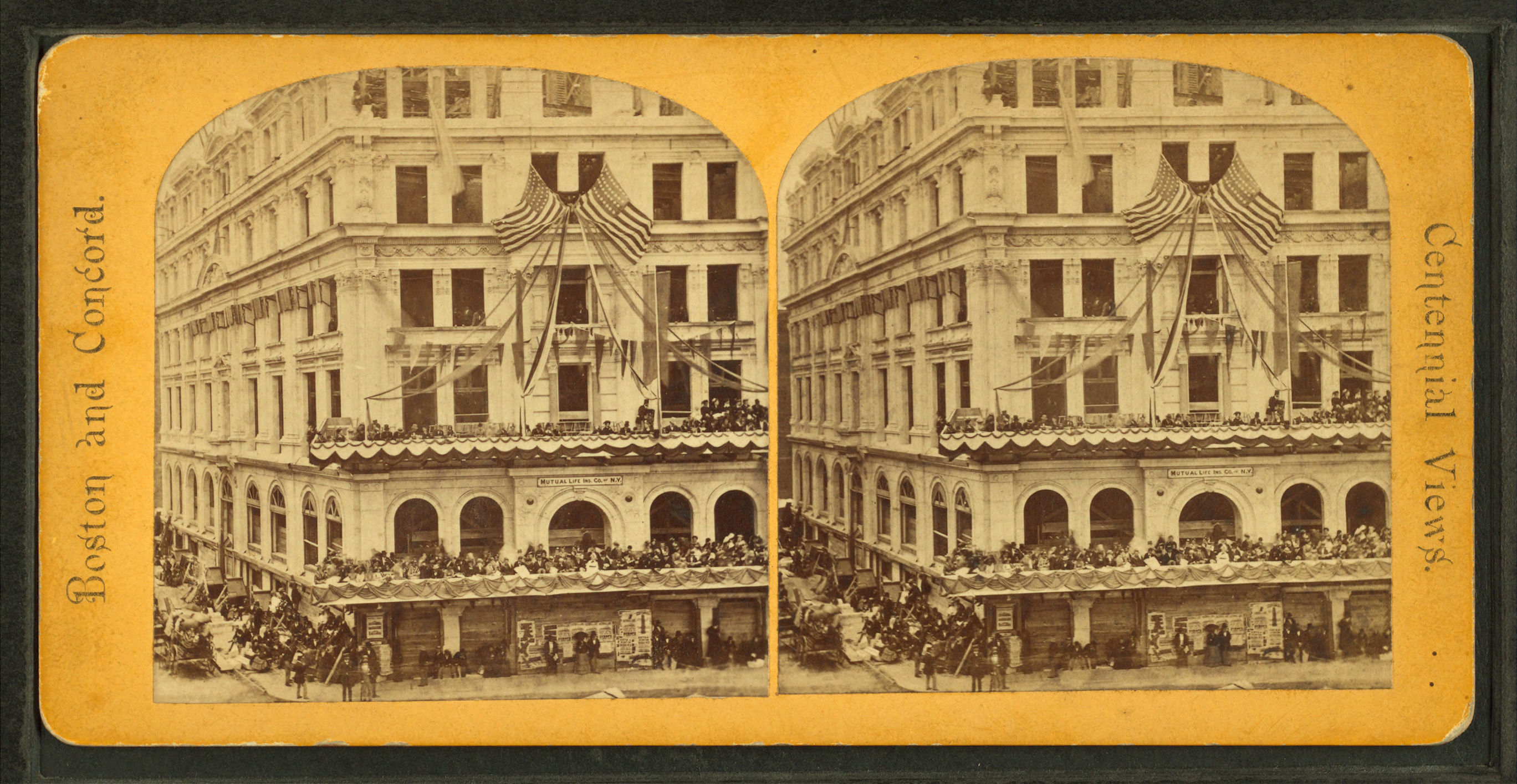
Post Office Square, Boston, 1876

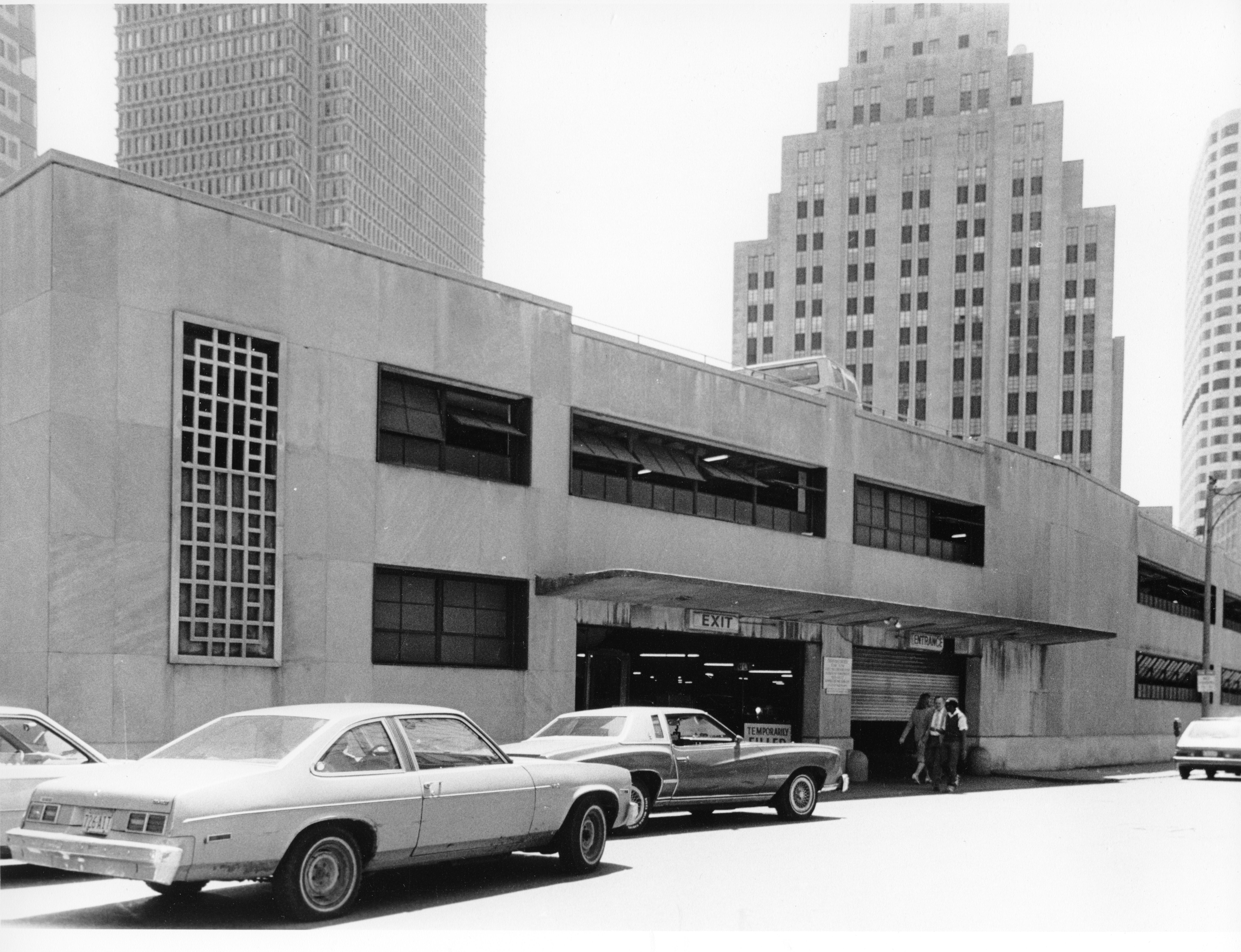
Garage in Post Office Square that was demolished to make way for the creation of Norman B. Leventhal Park.

In the 18th century, rope manufacturers occupied the area, then it became a residential district, and later a business and commercial area. The Great Boston Fire of 1872 swept through the area, and as rebuilding began the area began to be called Post Office Square after the new United States Post Office and Sub-Treasury Building which faced the square.

In 1874, the headquarters of the New England Mutual Life Insurance Company, designed by Nathaniel Bradlee, was erected in the square on the site of what is now Norman B. Leventhal Park. This building was demolished in 1945, and a large parking garage which filled the area of the present park was erected, being completed in 1954.

Post Office Square was the site of a 1964 speech by Lyndon B. Johnson.

There was a transformer explosion and fire in the One Post Office Square building in December 1986. An electric company worker was killed but it was after normal business hours and the building was able to be evacuated with only a few injuries.

The above-ground parking garage was demolished in 1988. The new garage, entirely underground, was opened in 1990 at a cost of $18 million, and the park above it was completed in 1992.

== Major buildings ==
Significant buildings on the square include the following:

- John W. McCormack Post Office and Courthouse
- New England Telephone and Telegraph Building is a historic structure built in 1947 at 185 Franklin Street. It is a Pending Boston Landmark. A developer purchased the building in 2011 and renamed it "50 Post Office Square." In this building, the laboratory in which the first telephone was built has been reconstructed.
- Langham Hotel Boston, a building that until 1977 housed the Federal Reserve Bank of Boston In 1978 it was designated a Boston Landmark.
- One Post Office Square
- 100 Federal Street
- Ten Post Office Square (Atlantic National Bank Building) built 1924, a pending Boston Landmark, petition accepted for further study in 2000.
