= One Post Office Square =

Skyscraper in Boston

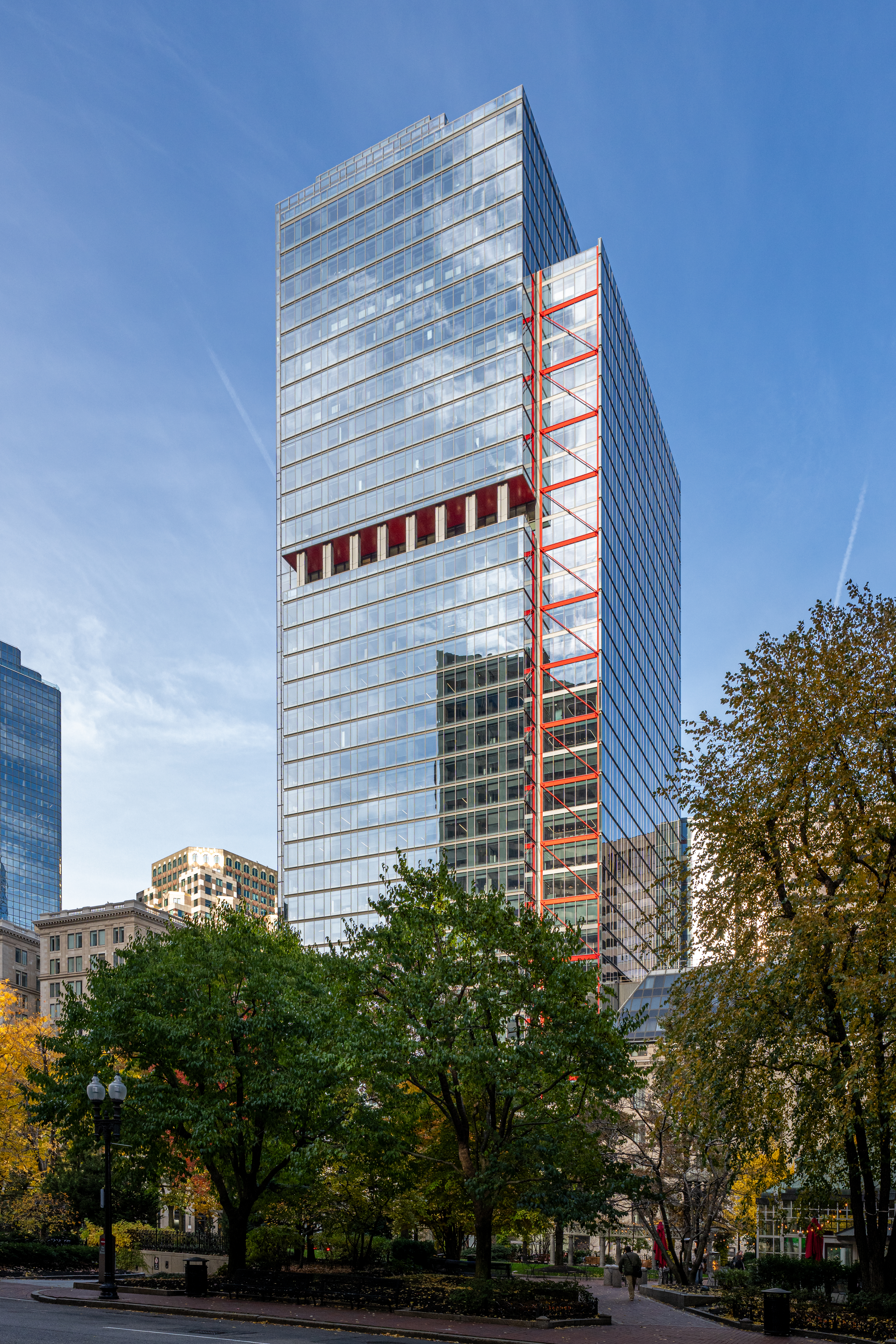
- Interactive map of the One Post Office Square area

General information
- Type: Office
- Location: 1 Post Office Square; Boston, Massachusetts
- Coordinates: 42.356827°N 71.055400°W
- Completed: 1981

Height
- Roof: 525 ft (160 m)

Technical details
- Floor count: 40
- Floor area: 766,068 ft (233,498 m)

Design and construction
- Architect: Jung Brannen Associates, Inc.
- Developer: EQ Office

One Post Office Square is a 42-floor modern skyscraper in the Financial District section of Boston, Massachusetts. The skyscraper is Boston's 15th-tallest building, standing 525 feet (160 m) tall. The building has 831,975 square feet of Class A office space. An attached, eight-level parking garage offers 368 parking spaces and direct access to the building's lobby. It overlooks Post Office Square Park and was designed by Jung Brannen Associates. A previous building on the site at 101 Milk Street was the headquarters of the Boston Elevated Railway until about 1919.

== Design and features ==
The exterior is modern style sculpted tower that consists of a steel frame with a concrete aggregate facade.

The three-story lobby is finished in patterned Rosso Verona and travertine marble walls and floors accented with mirror bronze signage, hand rails, and window bands. HVAC is controlled by an automated, Energy Management System for maximum comfort and efficiency. The building is connected to the adjoining Langham Hotel at ground level by a private passageway.

In 2018, the building began renovations to update the exterior of the building and add additional space. The project is set to be complete in 2021.

== Awards ==
- Building Owners and Managers Association (BOMA) Landlord of the Year Award, 2000

== See also ==
- List of tallest buildings in Boston
