= Pos (surname) =

Pos is a Dutch surname. Notable people with the surname include:

- Alette Pos (born 1962), Dutch field hockey player
- Jess Dal Pos (born 1993), Australian rules footballer
- Lucas Pos (born 1998), American soccer player
- Marc Pos (born 1968), Dutch creative entrepreneur
- Raymond Pos (1910–1964), Surinamese diplomat and lawyer
