= John Henri Isaac Browere =

American sculptor (1790–1834)

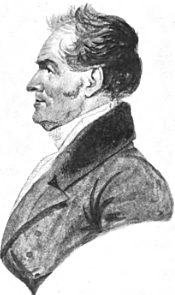
Portrait of Browere, 19th century

John Henri Isaac Browere (1792–1834) was an artist in New York in the early 19th century. He created life masks of Thomas Jefferson, Gilbert Stuart, Lafayette, John Quincy Adams, Edwin Forrest, Issac Van Wart, John Paulding, David Williams and other notables.
