= Phi Omega Sigma =

Phi Omega Sigma is a collegiate social and service fraternity/sorority in the Philippines.

Phi Omega Sigma may also refer to:

- Phi Omega Sigma former fraternity at the College of Wooster
- Phi Omega Sigma Christian Fraternity, Inc., a co-educational fraternity in Missouri State University
- Phi Omega Sigma, a women's social club in Oklahoma Baptist University
- Phi Omega Sigma, a housing group in Grove City College
- Phi Omega Sigma, a fraternity at the University of Puerto Rico at Arecibo
