= John W. McCormack Post Office and Courthouse =

Building in Boston, Massachusetts

- United States Post Office, Courthouse, and Federal Building
- U.S. National Register of Historic Places
- Boston Landmark
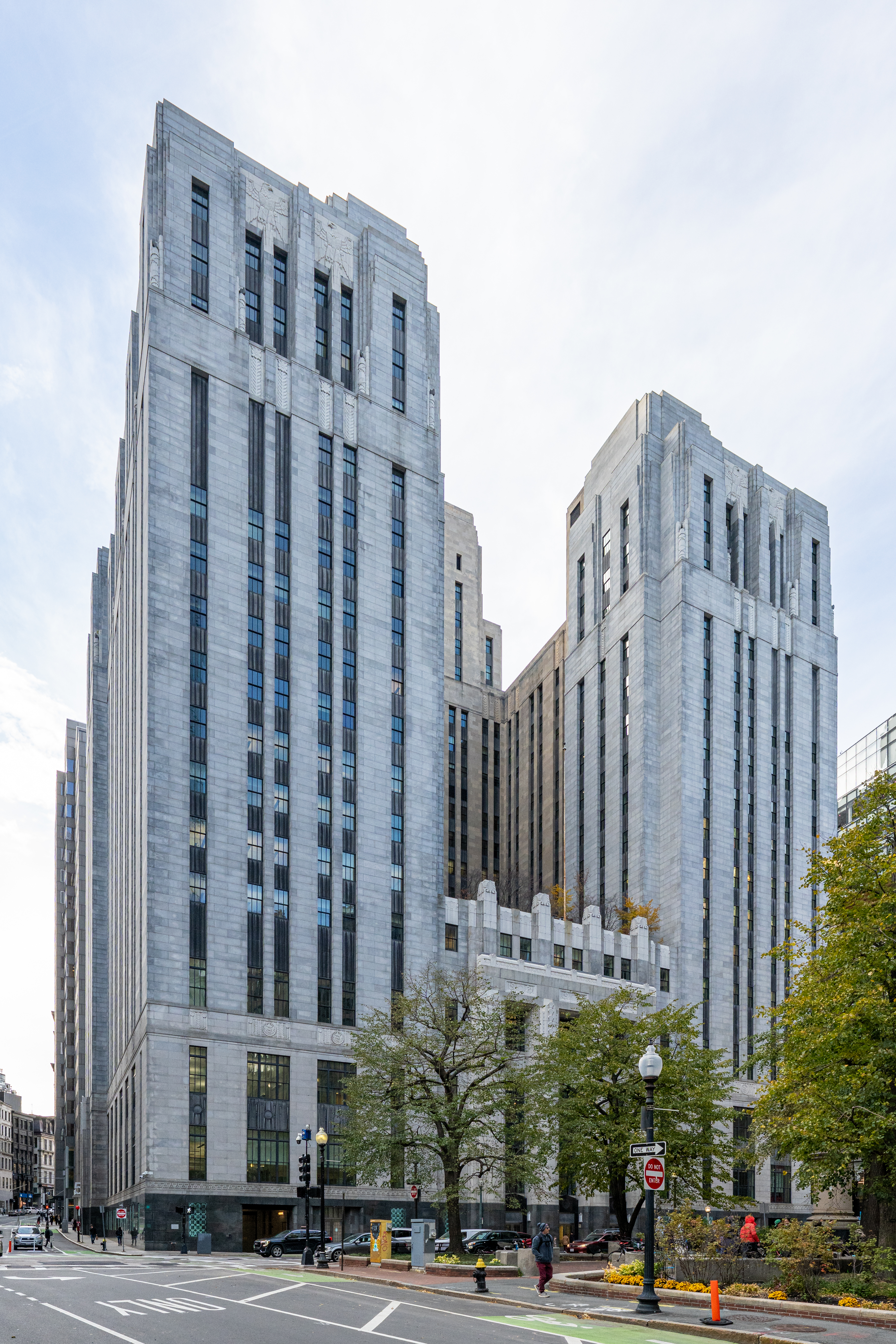
- Interactive map of United States Post Office, Courthouse, and Federal Building
- Location: 5 Post Office Square; Boston, Massachusetts
- Coordinates: 42°21′26″N 71°3′25″W
- Area: 2.2 acres (0.89 ha)
- Built: 1931–1933
- Architectural style: Art Deco
- NRHP reference No.: 11000160

Significant dates
- Added to NRHP: April 8, 2011
- Designated BOSL: March 20, 1998

The John W. McCormack Post Office and Courthouse, formerly the United States Post Office, Courthouse, and Federal Building, is a historic building at 5 Post Office Square in Boston, Massachusetts. The twenty-two-story, 331-foot (101 m) skyscraper was built between 1931 and 1933 to house federal courts, offices, and post office facilities. The Art Deco and Moderne structure was designed in a collaboration between the Supervising Architect of the United States Treasury Department and the Boston architectural firm of Cram and Ferguson. It occupies a city block bounded by Congress, Devonshire, Water, and Milk Streets, and has over 600,000 square feet (56,000 m^{2}) of floor space. The exterior of the building is faced in granite from a variety of New England sources, as well as Indiana limestone. It was built on the site of the 1885 United States Post Office and Sub-Treasury Building.

The building also contained the National Security Agency's Northeast Recruiting Office in Room 406. This office was overseen by the Office of Administration segment within the NSA and officially opened on November 7, 1980. Charles Raduazo acted as the chief headhunter in an effort to scout and employ electrical engineers and mathematicians from New England's elite colleges.

The building is named for John W. McCormack, a long-serving Boston Congressman who was Speaker of the House from 1962 to 1971. It was designated a Boston Landmark by the Boston Landmarks Commission in 1998 and listed on the National Register of Historic Places in 2011.

== See also ==
- List of United States post offices
- National Register of Historic Places listings in northern Boston, Massachusetts
