= Congress Street (Boston) =

Street in Boston, Massachusetts

Coordinates: 42°21′23.5″N 71°3′22.35″W

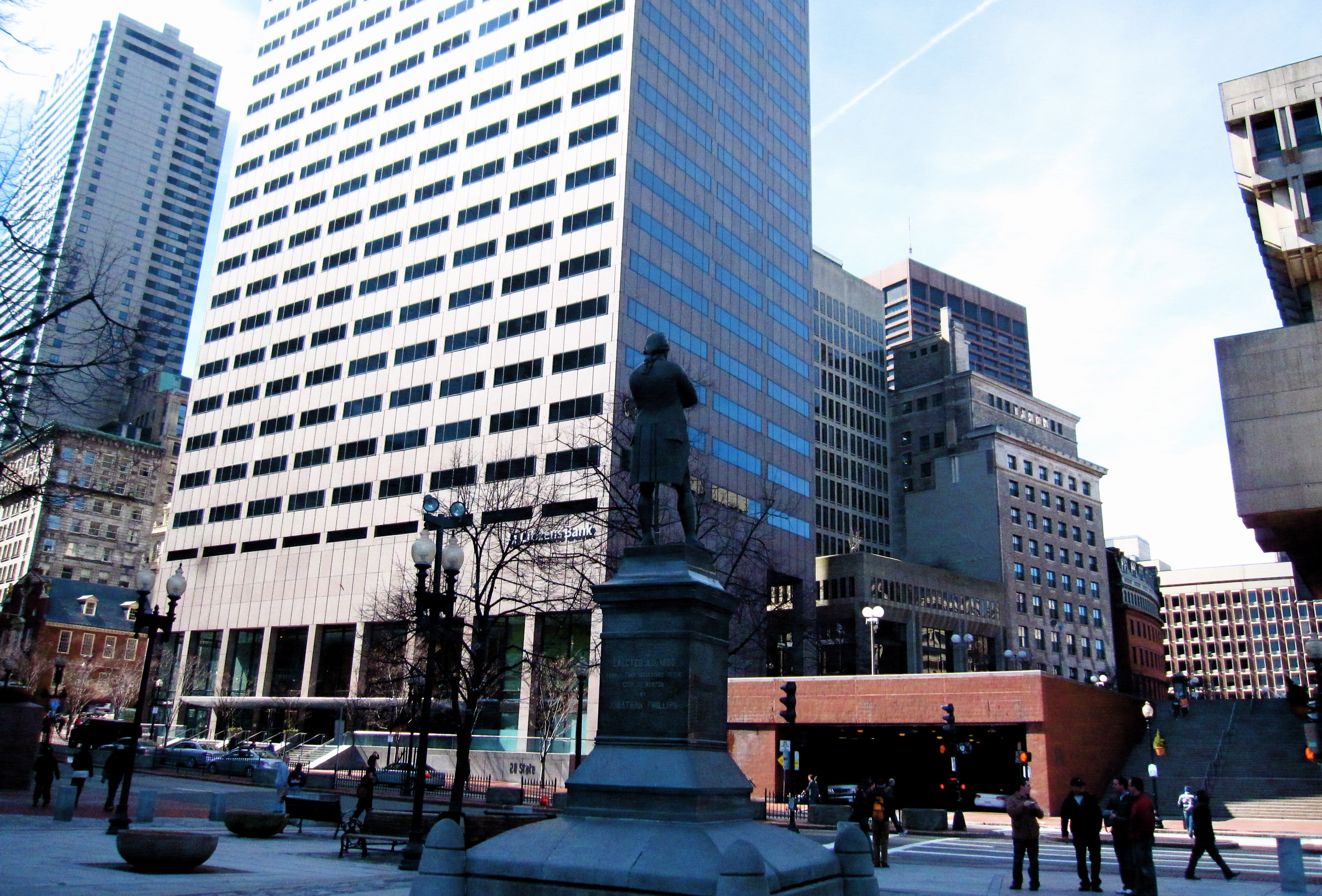
- Congress Street from Dock Square, Boston, 2010
- Interactive map of Congress Street
- West end: Sudbury Street / Merrimac Street
- Major junctions: State Street; Milk Street; Franklin Street; I-93 (Atlantic Ave./Purchase St.); Dorchester Avenue
- East end: Northern Avenue

Congress Street is located in the Financial District and South Boston neighborhoods of Boston, Massachusetts, United States. The street was first named in 1800. It was extended in 1854 (from State Street) as far as Atlantic Avenue, and in 1874 across Fort Point Channel into South Boston. The original swing bridge was replaced in 1930 by a bascule bridge, which is still extant and known as the Congress Street Bridge.

Today's Congress Street consists of several segments of streets, previously named Atkinson's Street, Dalton Street, Gray's Alley, Leverett's Lane, Quaker Lane, and Shrimpton's Lane.

== See also ==
- Boston Children's Museum
- Boston City Hall
- The Boston Post
- Boston Reds (1890–1891)
- Children's Wharf
- Congress Street Fire Station
- Congress Street Grounds
- Dock Square (Boston, Massachusetts)
- Exchange Coffee House, Boston
- Government Center, Boston
- John Hancock Building
- Julien Hall (19th century)
- Mobius Artists Group
- New England Holocaust Memorial
- Post Office Square, Boston, Massachusetts
- Russia Wharf Buildings
- Weekly Messenger newspaper
- World Trade Center (MBTA station)

== Images ==
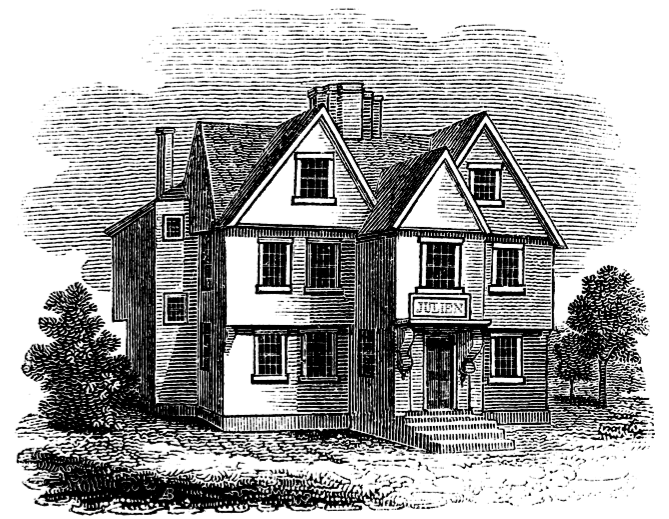
Julien's Restorator, corner of Milk Street and Congress St. (demolished 1824)

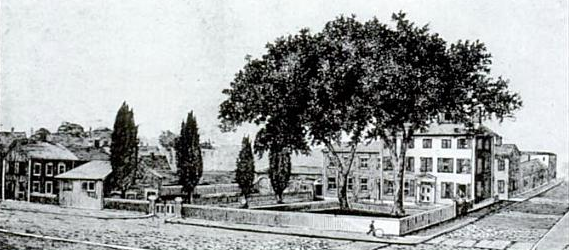
Dalton house, corner of Congress St. and Water St., Boston, c. 19th century

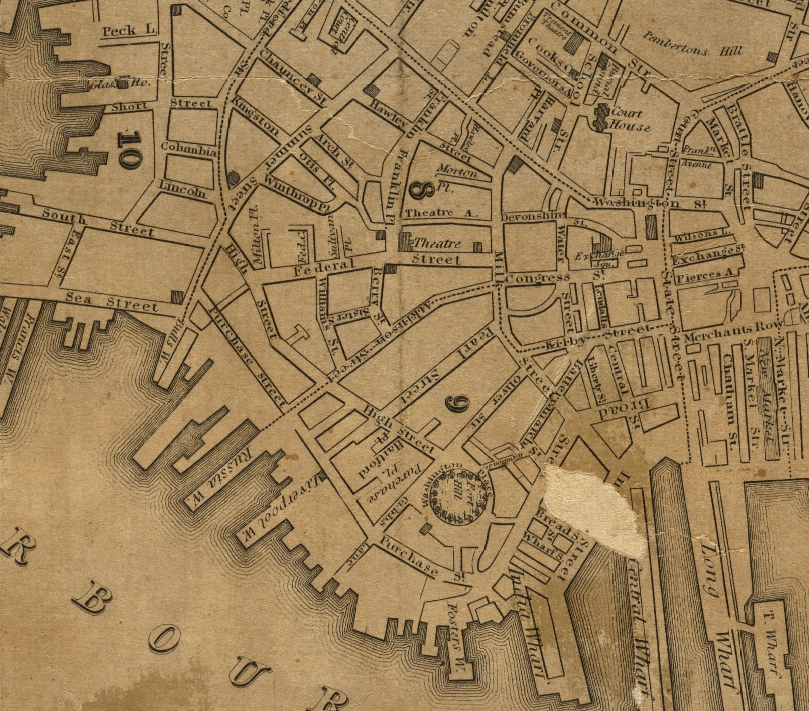
Detail of 1829 map of Boston, showing extent of Congress St.; (Atkinson St. would become part of Congress St. in 1854)

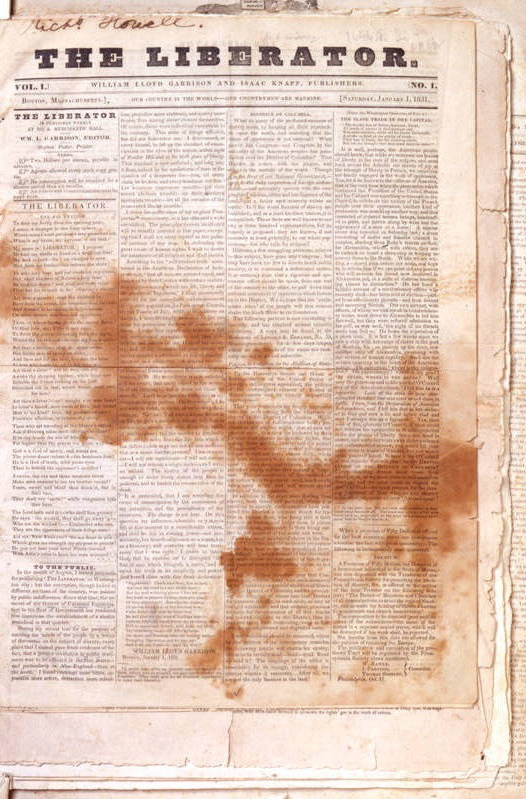
Issue No.1, The Liberator, 1831; published from Office #11, Merchants Hall, on Water Street at the corner of Congress Street, Boston

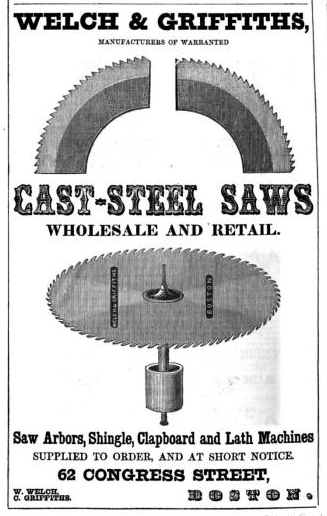
Advertisement for Welch & Griffiths, cast-steel saws, 1852

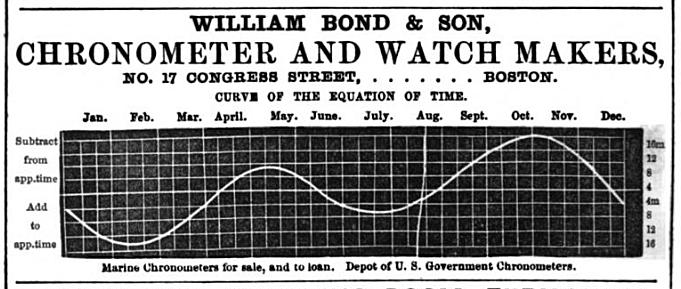
Advertisement for William Bond & Son, chronometer and watch makers, 1861

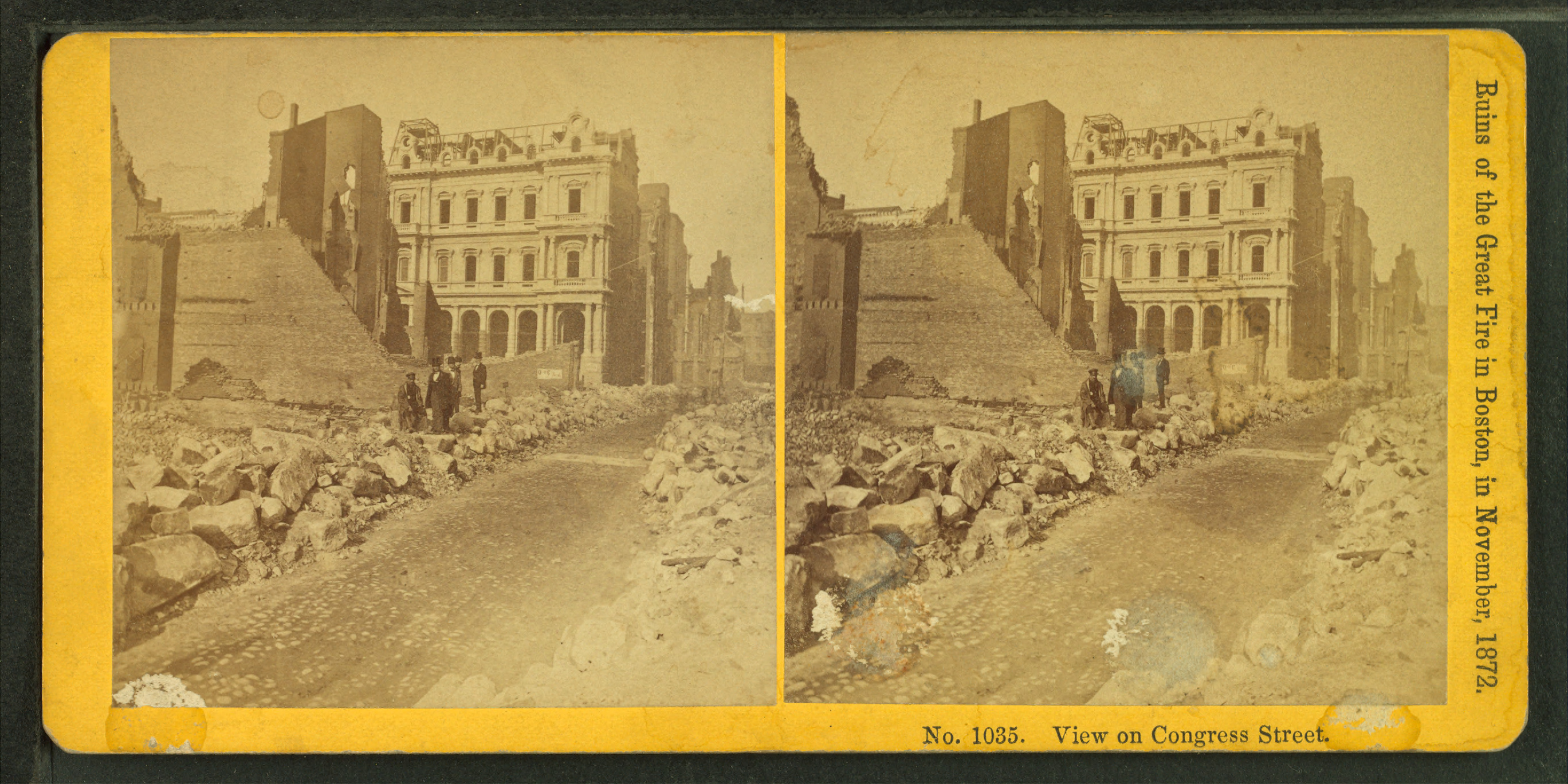
Congress St. after the fire of 1872

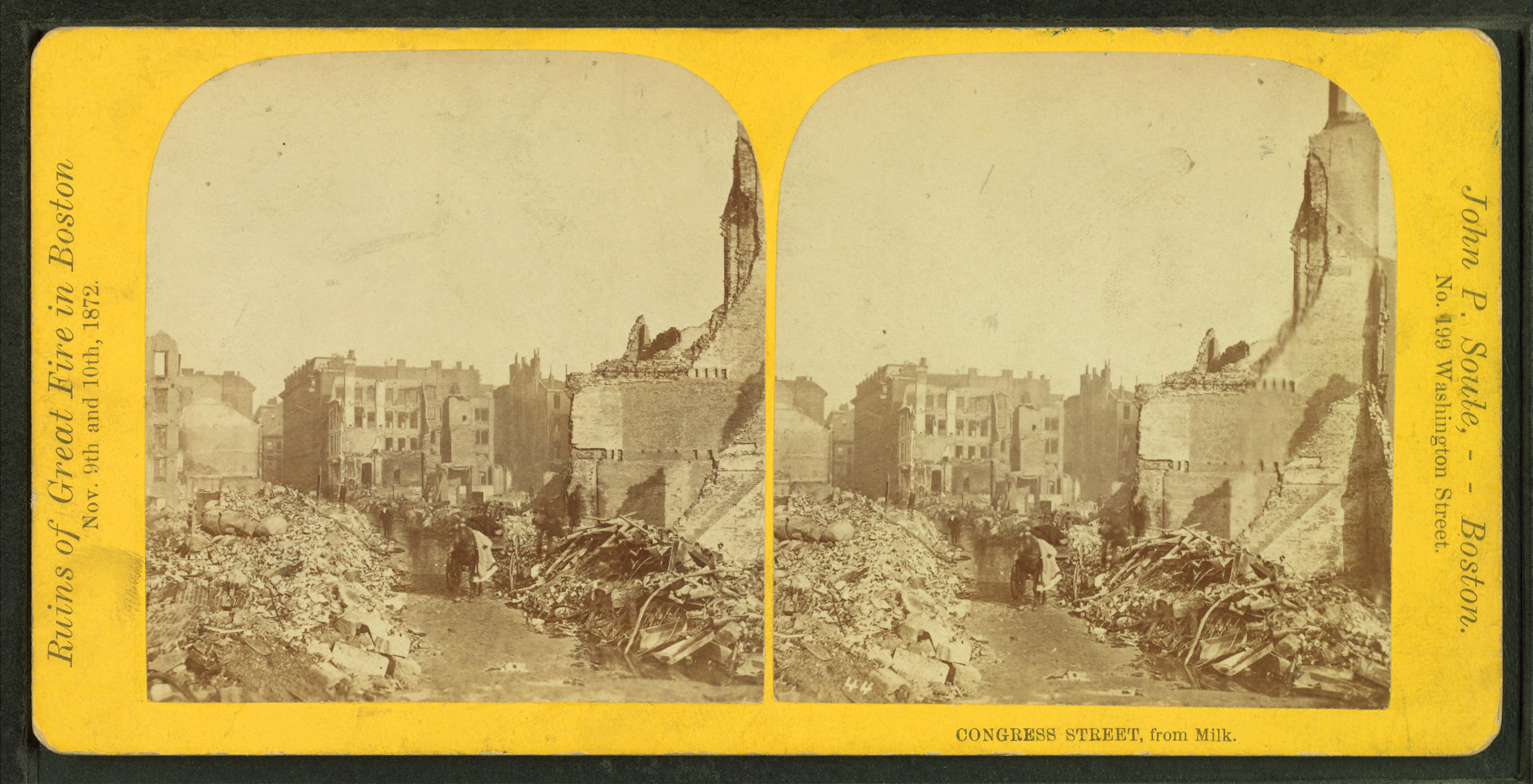
Congress St. (looking from Milk St.), after the fire, 1872; photo by John P. Soule

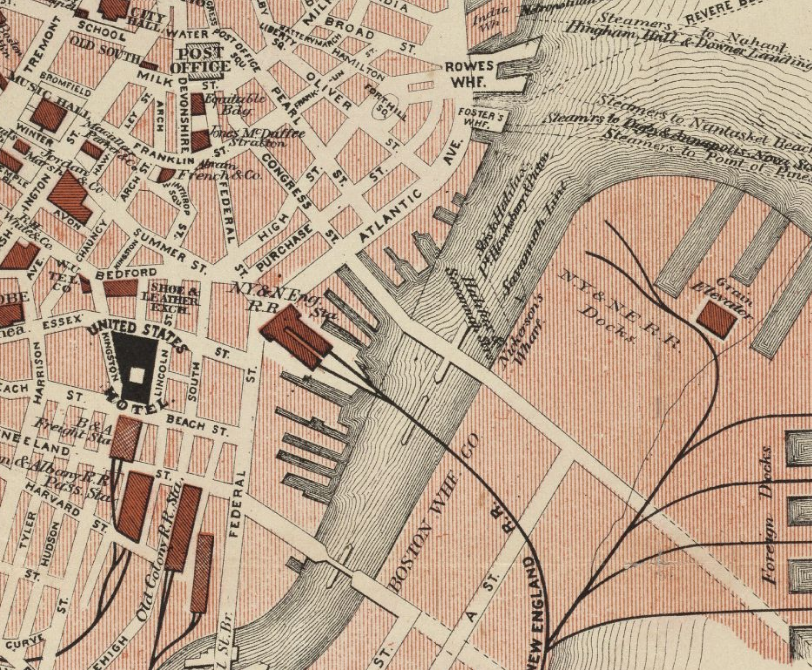
Detail of 1883 map of Boston, showing Congress St. and vicinity

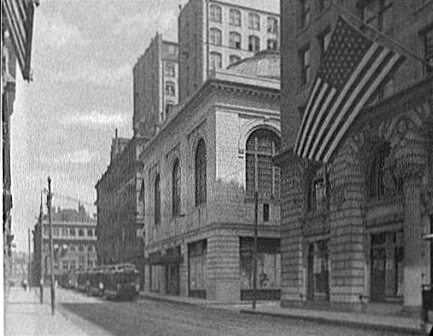
Stock Exchange, Congress St., Boston, 1910s

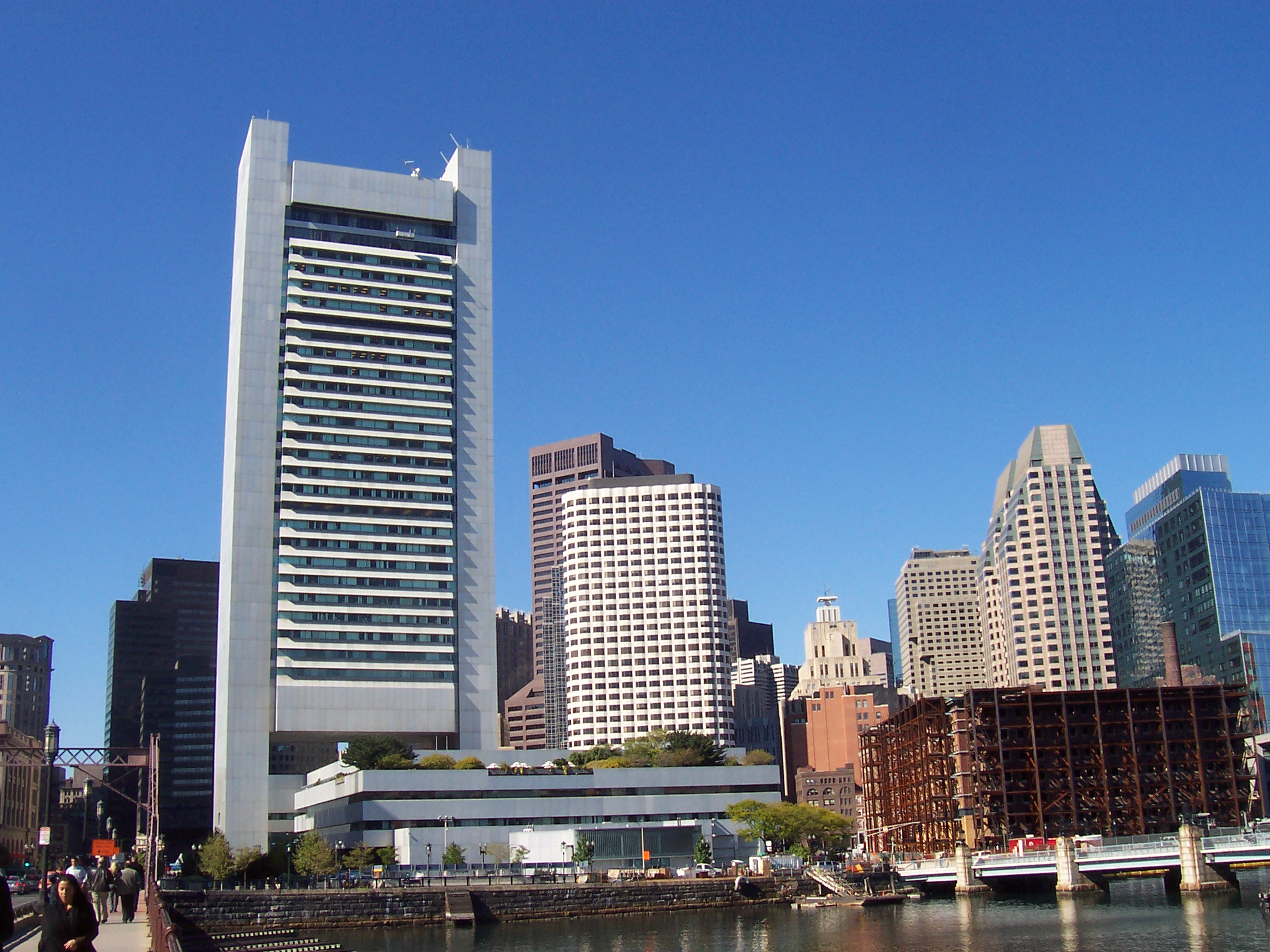
Congress Street Bridge (at far right), 2007

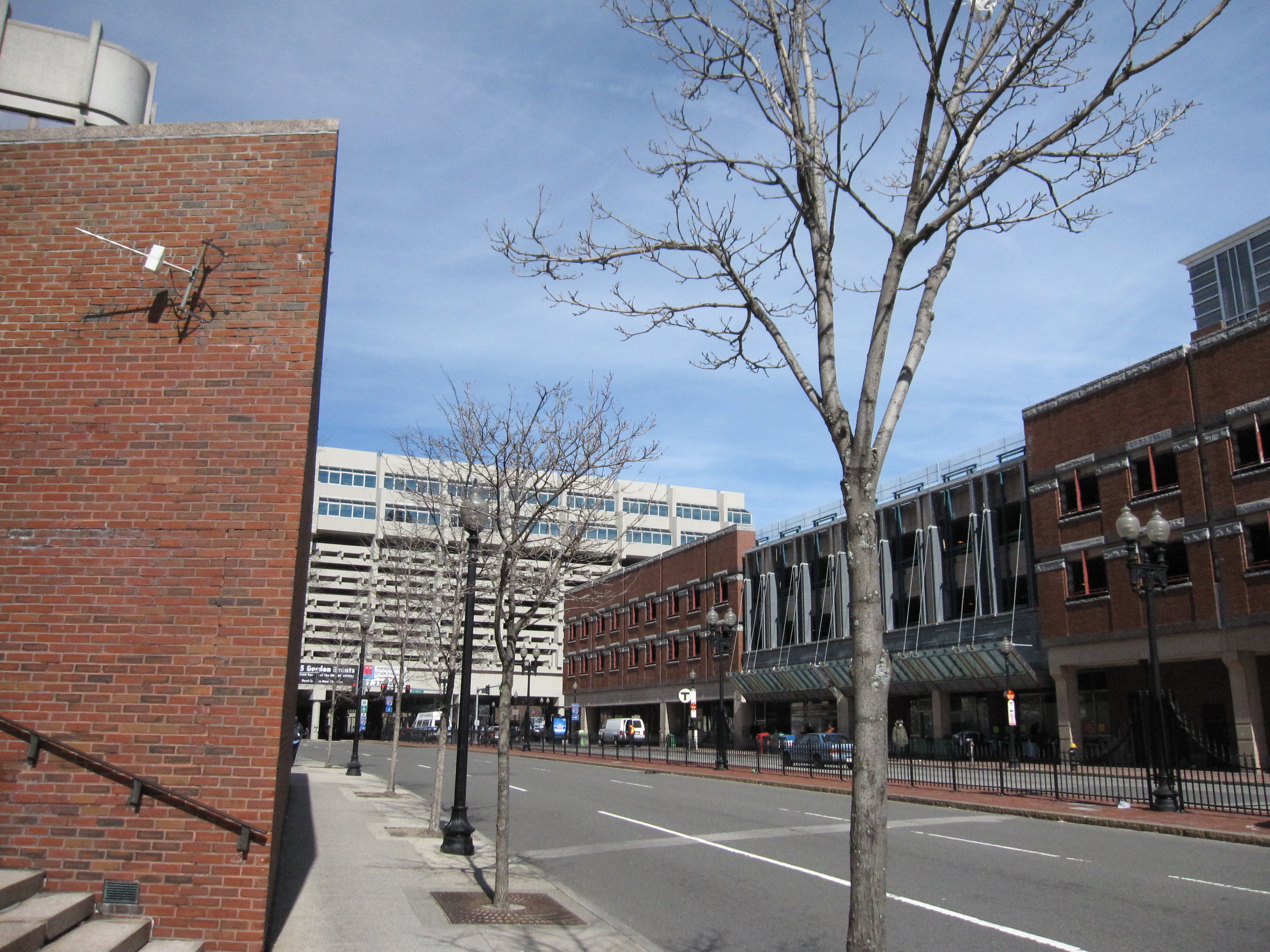
Congress St., Boston, looking towards Merrimac St., 2010
