= Vasundhara Prabhu =

Indian educator

- Born: Post-colonial India
- Other names: Vas Prabhu
- Education: Cornell University (Psychology); Bank Street College of Education (Museum Leadership Program)
- Occupation: Museum educator
- Employer(s): Farnsworth Art Museum (Director of Education); San Diego Museum of Art; Peabody Essex Museum; Fine Arts Museums of San Francisco; Museum of Contemporary Art, Los Angeles (MOCA); Boston Children's Museum; H.F. Johnson Museum of Art (Cornell University)
- Known for: Pioneering work in museum education programs, including family guides, exhibition interpretation, and education-oriented museum spaces.
- Awards: NAEA Museum Education Division Regional Award (1984); NAEA Educator of the Year Award (1996); EdCom Award for Excellence in Practice (2002); CAEA and CAAE awards

Vasundhara "Vas" Prabhu is the Director of Education at the Farnsworth Art Museum located in Rockland, Maine. She has over 42 years of experience in museum education where she has worked to increase diversity within the field and has been nationally recognized for her pioneering work in education programs particularly family guides and in exhibition interpretation and education oriented spaces within the museum viewing experience.

== Early life and education ==
Prabhu was born and raised in post-colonial India, where she was influenced by Mahatma Gandhi's Socratic teaching philosophy that every classroom is a learning community and the teacher is the facilitator of knowledge. Prabhu moved and traveled all over the world as a child, where she would visit museums to learn about the different cities where she lived to find out each city’s prominent families, history and artistic values.

She graduated from Cornell University with a degree in Psychology and later attended Bank Street College of Education’s Museum Leadership Program.

== Career ==
Prabhu began her work initially as a part-time staff at Cornell University’s H.F. Johnson Museum of Art. During her time there, she was invited to attend a National Art Education Association conference in 1976, where she and other fellow museum educators met and originated the profession’s official name of art museum educators. From there, Prabhu worked at the Boston Children's Museum from 1984-1987 with Michael Spock, Elaine Gurian and Leslie Bedford organizing cultural festivals and artistic programs, which combined her interests in museums and cultural anthropology.

It was this work at Boston Children's that caught the attention of Richard Koshalek, then director of the Museum of Contemporary Art, Los Angeles (MOCA). Koshalek came out to interview Prabhu and offer her the job as the first Director of Education at the museum in 1988, where she also worked with Kim Kanatani. Prabhu, in collaboration with Koshalek, was one of the first museums to send printed multilingual family art guides to museum directors across the country.

In 1995, Prabhu began working at the Fine Arts Museums of San Francisco: De Young Museum and Legion of Honor (museum). At the DeYoung, Prabhu helped to create one of the earliest searchable databases for the public, researchers and academics about the Legion's print and graphic art collections; the result of earthquake damage and historic renovations that were at the time occurring in the museum. While at the DeYoung, Prabhu also pioneered reading rooms and artist studios and interactive art exhibitions for families within the museum where visitors could engage with the artists, art making, reading and computer database.

In 2001, Prabhu became the First Deputy Director for Interpretation and Education, at the Peabody Essex Museum in Salem, Massachusetts. While working at PEM, Prabhu was involved with the interpretation of the Huang family's Yin Yu Tang House. She helped to oversee the exhibitions plus education concept at PEM, which is still being implemented.

From 2006-2010, Prabhu worked as the Deputy Director for Education & Interpretation at the San Diego Museum of Art, then was an independent museum educator until she moved to work at the Farnsworth Art Museum.

== Awards and articles ==
- NAEA Museum Education Division Regional Award (1984)
- Guip, David, Lynda Lowe, Vas Prabhu and Judith Sloane Blocker. “Instructional Resources: Religious Art.” Art Education, vol. 40, no. 5, 1987
- Prabhu, Vas. “Instructional Resources: Contemporary Art: Familiar Objects in New Contexts.” Art Education, vol. 43, no. 4, 1990
- NAEA Educator of the Year Award (1996)
- Kanatani, Kim and Vas Prabhu. “Instructional Resources: Artists Comment on Museum Practices.” Art Education, vol. 49, no. 2, 1996
- Prabhu, Vas, Ian Roper and Nigel Van Zwanenberg. “(ONLY) JUST-IN-TIME: JAPANISATION AND THE 'NON-LEARNING' FIRM.” Work, Employment & Society, vol. 11, no. 1, 1997
- EdCom Award for Excellence in Practice (2002)
- Top Ten Child Friendly Art Museums Award: Child Magazine : Peabody Essex Museum
- CAEA and CAAE awards: Fine Arts Museums of San Francisco
