= Leslie Bedford =

Leslie Bedford may refer to:

- Leslie Bedford (educator)
- Leslie Bedford (rugby union)
