= The Computer Museum =

The Computer Museum may refer to:

- The Computer Museum, Boston
- The Computer History Museum, in Mountain View, California

== See also ==
- List of computer museums
