= Gwen Bell =

American museum president (born 1934)

- Born: July 20, 1934 (age 92); Elkader, Iowa, U.S.
- Education: University of Wisconsin–Madison (BS 1957); Harvard University (MCRP 1959); Clark University (PhD 1967)
- Occupation: Conservationist
- Spouse: Gordon Bell

Gwen Bell (born July 20, 1934) was the first president of The Computer Museum in Boston, which she co-founded with her then-husband Gordon Bell.

== Life ==
Bell earned her Bachelor's degree from the University of Wisconsin in 1957, and a Master of City and Regional Planning from Harvard University in 1959. In 1967 she earned her PhD in geography from Clark University.

From 1966 to 1972, she was an associate professor of urban affairs at the University of Pittsburgh's Graduate School of Public and International Affairs. In 1972, she was a visiting associate professor at the Harvard Graduate School of Design. During this time period she was also the editor of the monthly periodical Ekistics: The Problems and Science of Human Settlements of Ekistics in Athens, Greece (1966–1977) and a consultant to the United Nations for Indonesia, the Philippines, and Brazil (1970–1977).

After a short stint in 1978 as a social science editor for Pergamon Press (1978), Bell co-founded and became the first President of The Computer Museum (1979–1997). Bell also served as President of the Association for Computing Machinery (ACM) from 1992 to 1994.
