= Guaranteed Pure Milk bottle =

Water tower in Montreal, Canada

Coordinates: 45.4959°N 73.5727°W

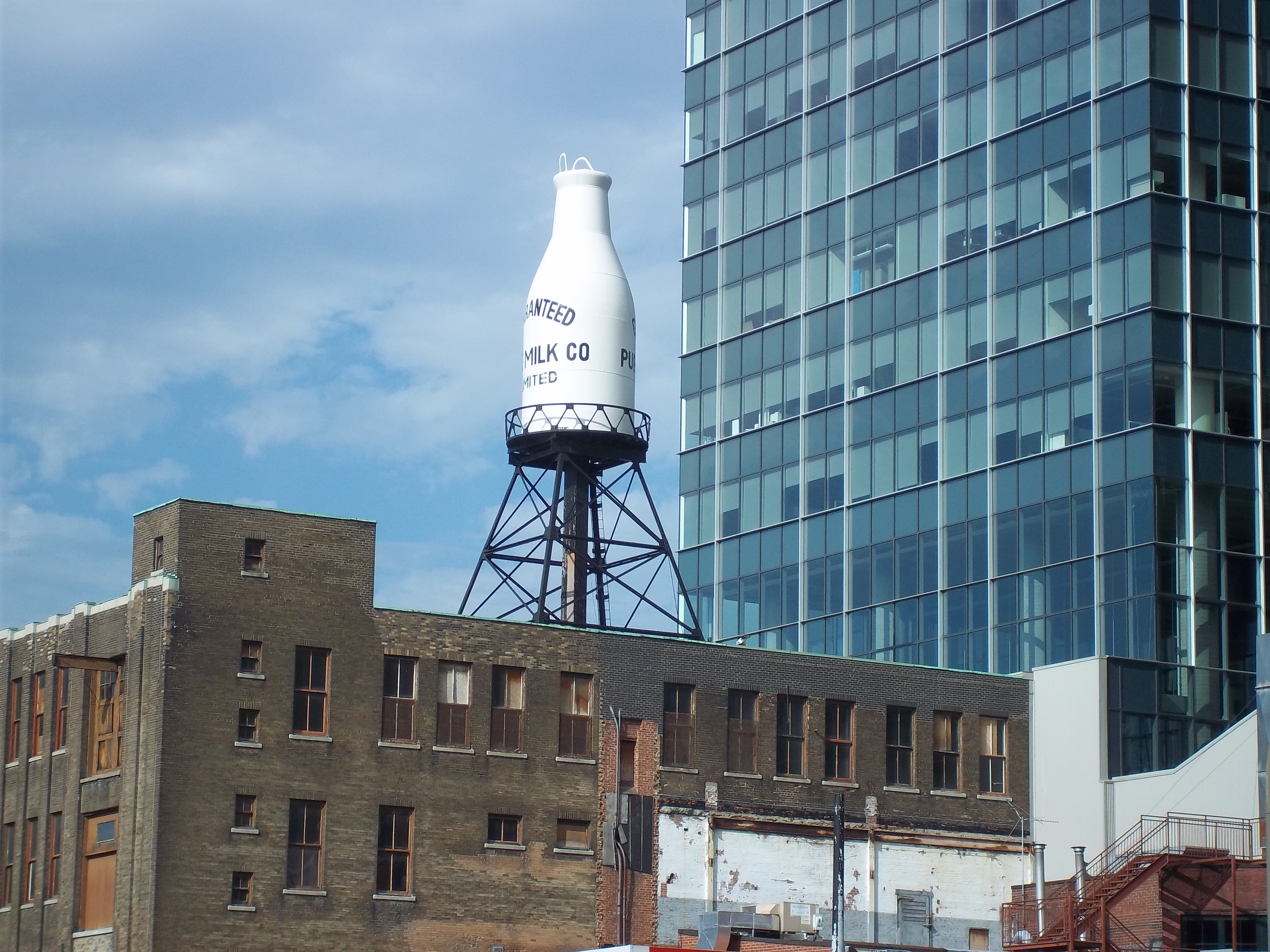
After restoration, in August 2011

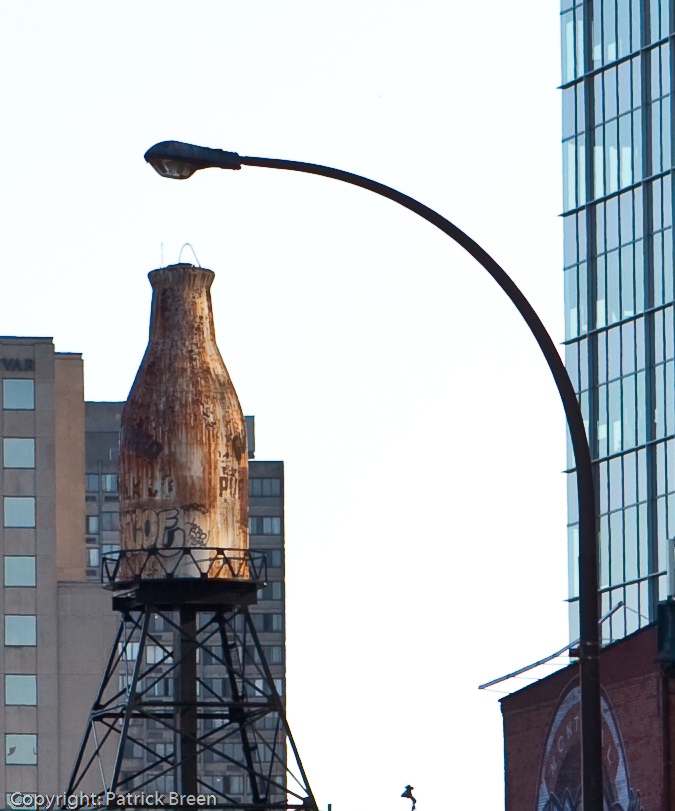
Before restoration, in June 2009

The Guaranteed Pure Milk bottle is a landmark water tower in Montreal, Quebec, Canada, located at 1025 Lucien L'Allier Street (previously rue de l'Aqueduc). The 6-tonne (13,000 lb), 10-metre (33 ft)-high Art Deco structure was designed in 1930 by architects Hutchison, Wood & Miller as advertising for the Guaranteed Pure Milk Company (founded 1900). The building on which it stands is the former headquarters of the Guaranteed Pure Milk Company and is visible in the movie "Red 2" as the exterior of the "Yankee White Facility", although the water tower itself is not.

The giant riveted steel quart of milk was built by Dominion Bridge Company of Lachine. It has a 250,000-litre (66,000 US gal; 55,000 imp gal) capacity.

The bottle ceased being used in the 1970s but remained with the building even after the dairy was sold to (and disappeared under) Ault Foods in 1990.

In 2009, it was restored after years of disrepair, thanks to the efforts of volunteers, $100,000 in private donations, and lobbying by Heritage Montreal.

== See also ==
- Benewah Milk Bottle
- Hood Milk Bottle
- Milk Bottle Grocery
