= Benewah Milk Bottle =

- U.S. National Register of Historic Places
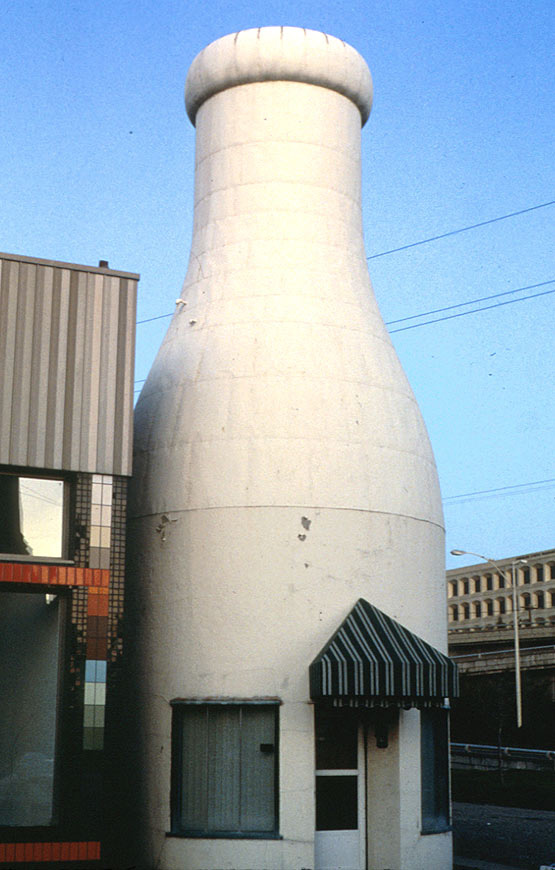
- The Benewah Milk Bottle was completed in 1935. This structure was one of two in the Spokane area.

- Location within Spokane riverfront area
- Location: S. 321 Cedar St. 802 W. Garland Ave. Spokane, Washington, United States
- Coordinates: 47°39′10″N 117°25′56″W
- Area: 0.1 acres (0.040 ha)
- Built: 1935
- Built by: W. G. Myers
- Architect: Whitehouse & Price
- Architectural style: Novelty architecture
- NRHP reference No.: 86001521
- Added to NRHP: August 13, 1986

The Benewah Milk Bottle is a landmark in Spokane, Washington. Listed in the National Register of Historic Places, there are two constructed milk bottle-shaped buildings in the Spokane area, which accompanied a successful dairy operation's stores. One of the buildings is located on South Cedar Street in Downtown Spokane, while the other is located two miles north in the Garland Historical District of North Hill.

On the morning of September 26, 2011, the Garland Historical District Milk Bottle restaurant, owned by Mary Lou Ritchie, and the historical Ferguson's Café, located next door, were heavily damaged in a fire. Fire investigators believe the fire started in a walkway between the two restaurants.

== History ==
The bottle was completed in 1935 and is a classic example of literalism in advertising. The bottle is stuccoed from its base to where it begins to taper to the bottle's neck. The neck and cap are sheet metal over a wooden frame. The entire bottle had an original white paint. It was Paul E. Newport who built the milk bottles. Newport owned the thriving Benewah Dairy Company. Company ads stated the bottles were "designed to build better men and women by making dairy products attractive to boys and girls. No expense will be spared to make these new stores as sturdy as fine, and as good as the products they represent."

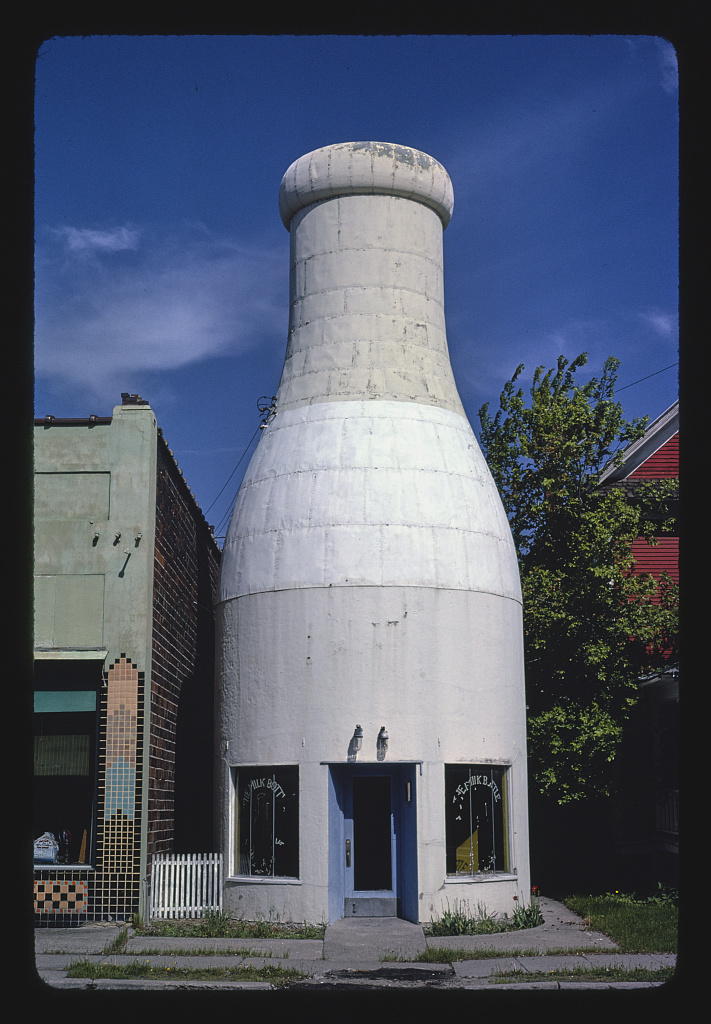
Photograph by John Margolies

The milk bottle was photographed by John Margolies who captured images of roadside attractions around the United States.

== See also ==
- Hood Milk Bottle
- Guaranteed Pure Milk bottle
- Milk Bottle Grocery
