= Children's Wharf =

Wharf in Boston, Massachusetts, U.S.

Coordinates: 42.3528°N 71.0495°W

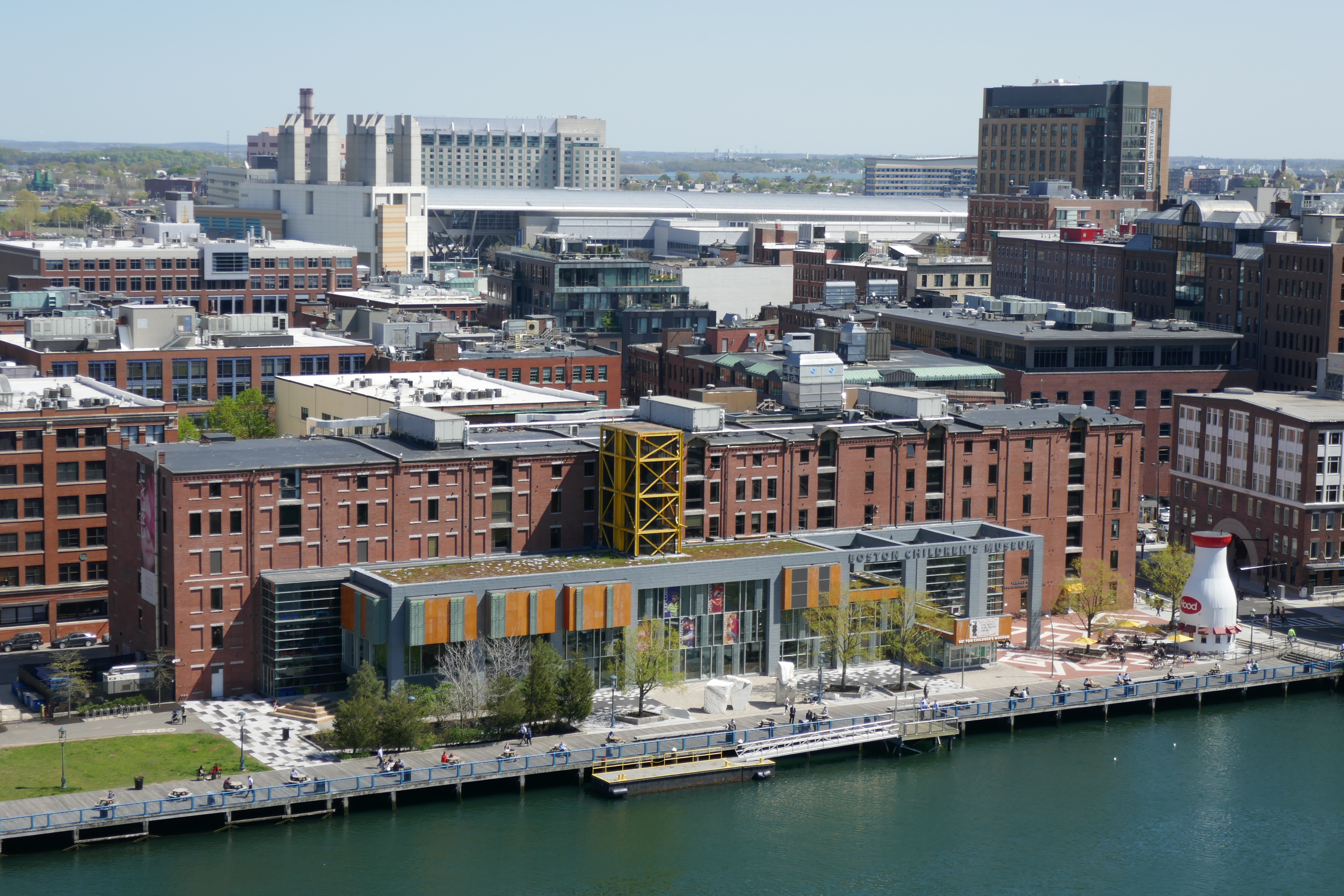
Children's Wharf

Children's Wharf (until recently known as Museum Wharf) is a wharf on Congress Street in Boston, Massachusetts, on the Fort Point Channel with views of the Financial District and Boston Harbor. The wharf has sitting areas, patches of lawn, and several tourist attractions.

By way of the Congress Street Bridge, Children's Wharf is a short walk from South Station, one of Boston's principal transportation hubs. The wharf is one of the more easily accessible locations on the Harborwalk, a newly established walking tour akin to the Freedom Trail, intended to take advantage of the change in landscape brought about by the Big Dig.

== Boston Children's Museum ==
The wharf takes its name from Boston Children's Museum (founded in 1913), which moved here from Jamaica Plain in 1979.

The museum is housed in a former industrial building expanded and renovated by Cambridge Seven Associates to take full advantage of the dramatic waterfront site.

In 2007 the museum completed a $47 million renovation and 23,000-square-foot (2,100 m^{2}) expansion. The improvements include green features such as green roofs, storm water reclamation to reduce run-off into Fort Point Channel, and building materials that are recycled, local, and low-emitting to qualify the Museum for the U.S. Green Building Council's LEED certification.

Au Bon Pain is located on the ground floor of the museum in a space formerly occupied by McDonald's.

== Hood Milk Bottle ==
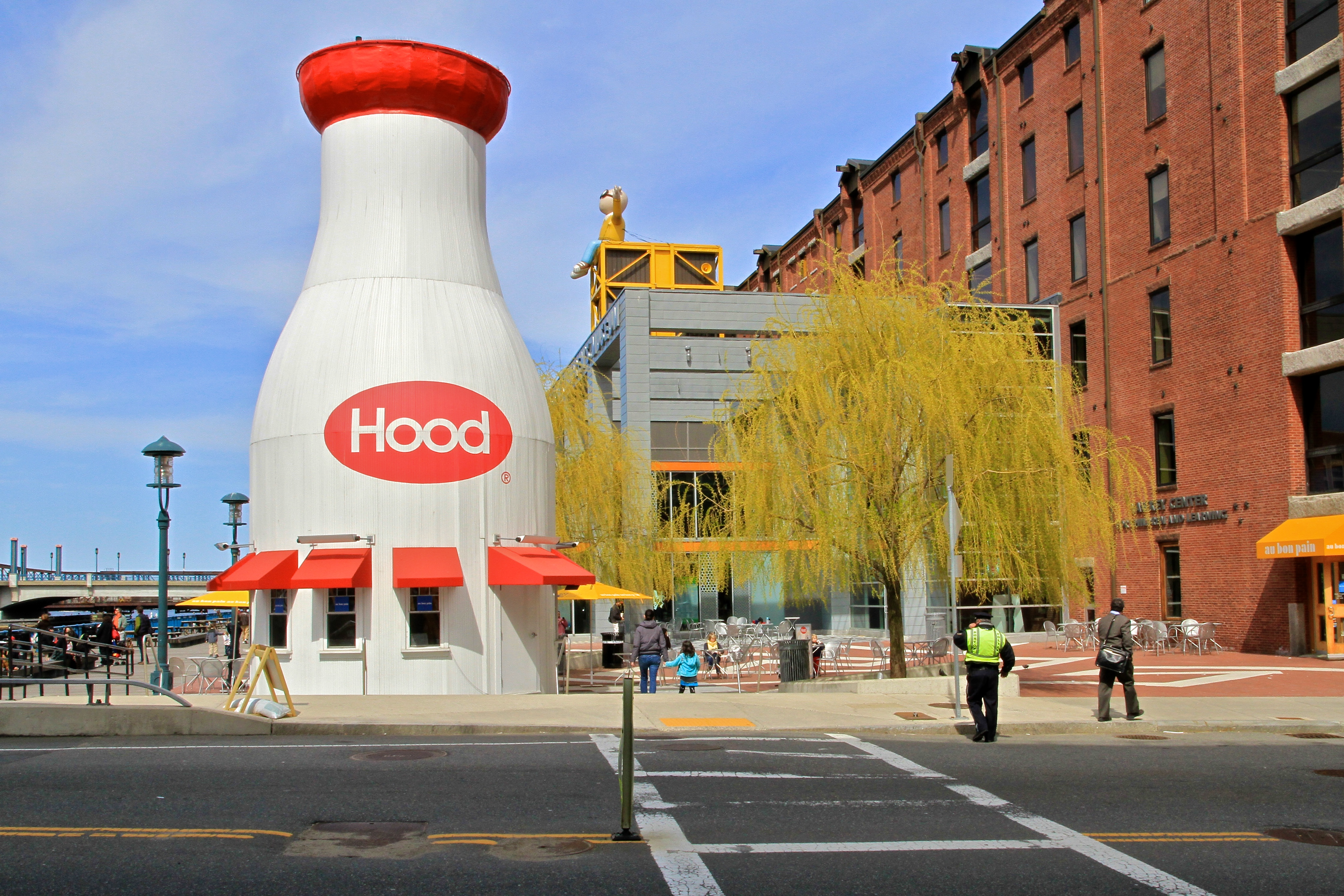
The Hood Milk Bottle, originally constructed in Taunton, Massachusetts, is an iconic tourist attraction on Children's Wharf. It serves as an ice cream stand and snack bar.

At 40 feet (12 m) tall and 18 feet (5.5 m) in diameter, the structure now known as the Hood Milk Bottle was originally constructed in 1933 on the banks of the Three Mile River in Taunton, Massachusetts.

Abandoned in 1967 and photographed by Walker Evans in 1974, the bottle was cut into three sections and moved by barge to Boston in 1977. Reassembled on the wharf, the Depression-era structure resumed its original function as an ice cream stand and snack bar.

In 2006, the bottle was "uncapped" (its original top half was sliced off and preserved) so that its base could be moved slightly and rebuilt on a newly renovated Children's Museum Plaza. It was officially re-dedicated by Boston Mayor Thomas Menino on April 20, 2007, thirty years to the day after it was moved to the wharf.

== Computer Museum ==
The Computer Museum, founded in 1979 with the help of Digital Equipment Corporation, opened to the public here in the fall of 1984. The Computer Museum shared space with the Children's Museum and featured exhibits such as a virtual fish tank, a robot theater, and a two-story tall representation of a computer through which visitors could walk.

In 1999. The Computer Museum closed this location. Much of its collection moved to Mountain View, California and became the Computer History Museum. The rest of its collection merged with that of the Museum of Science.

== Tea Party Ship ==
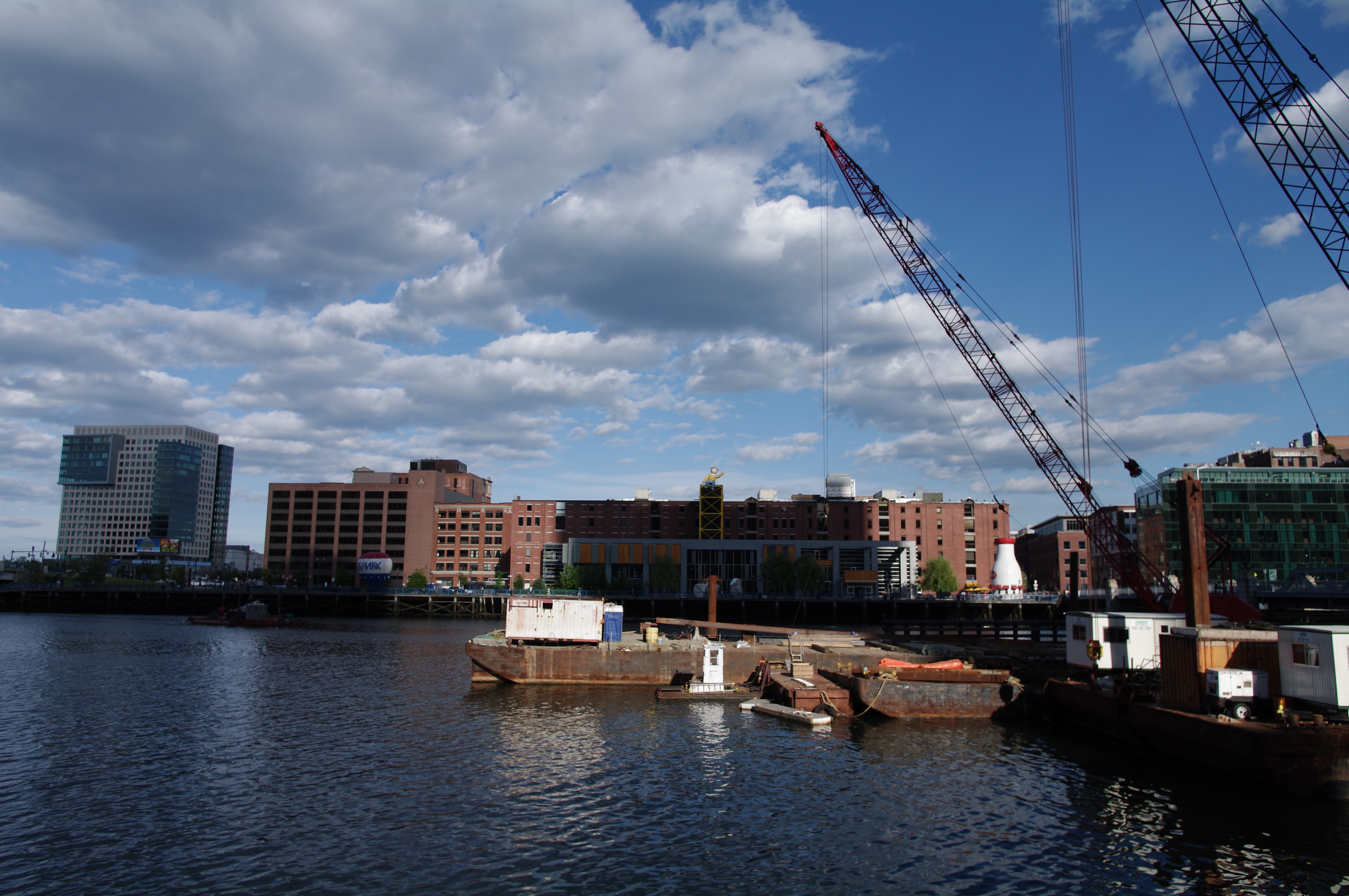
Fort Point Channel in June 2011, with the new museum under construction.

A "floating museum" focusing on the Boston Tea Party, the Boston Tea Party Ship and Museum was moored on Congress Street near the wharf. The vessel was a replica of the Beaver, one of the British ships ransacked by the Sons of Liberty during events leading up to the American Revolution.

Established in 1973, the site has hosted millions of visitors and was long the site of an annual Boston Tea Party historical reenactment each December 16. It has also been used a staging area for tax protests and political rallies. The museum was closed for eleven years after a fire, but reopened in June 2012.
