= Milk Bottle Grocery =

Historic building in Oklahoma City

- U.S. National Register of Historic Places
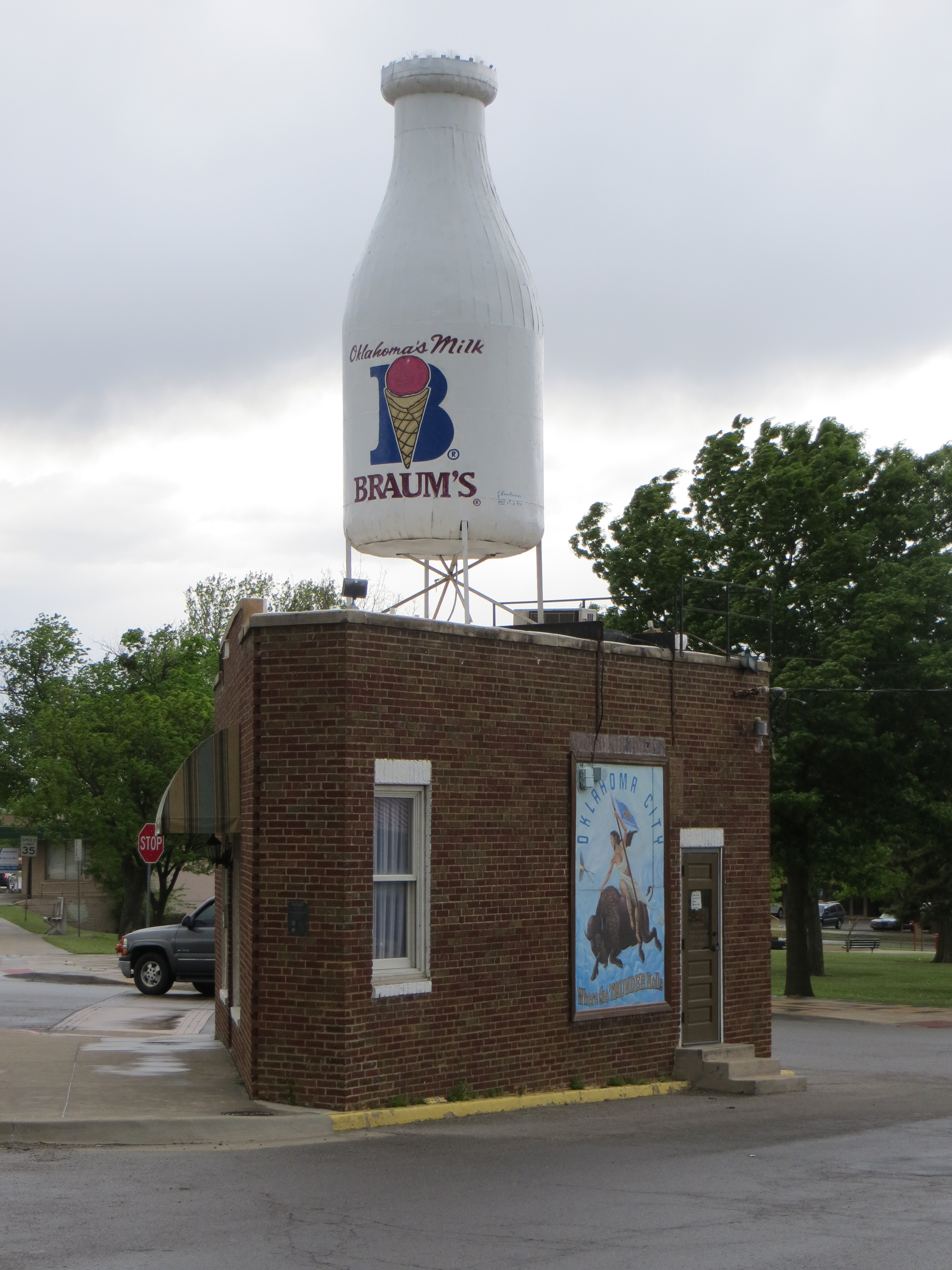
- Milk Bottle Grocery in 2014

- Location within Oklahoma Location within the United States
- Location: 2426 N. Classen Blvd., Oklahoma City, Oklahoma
- Coordinates: 35°29′39″N 97°31′55″W
- Area: less than one acre
- Built: 1930
- Architectural style: commercial style
- NRHP reference No.: 98000199
- Added to NRHP: March 5, 1998

The Milk Bottle Grocery, located at 2426 N. Classen Boulevard in Oklahoma City, Oklahoma, is a grocery building with a large metal Braum's milk bottle atop its roof. The store was constructed in 1930, and the milk bottle was added in ca. 1948. The bottle was designed to draw attention to the store, as the tall bottle would be visible to automobile traffic along Classen Boulevard, which was part of U.S. Route 66 at the time; it also served as an advertisement for the dairy industry. The store is also one of the few triangular buildings in Oklahoma City, as it occupies a corner lot in an area where Classen Boulevard cuts diagonally through the city's street grid. Due to its shape, the store was known as the Triangle Grocery from 1940 until 1948, when it became the Milk Bottle Grocery due to its new statue.

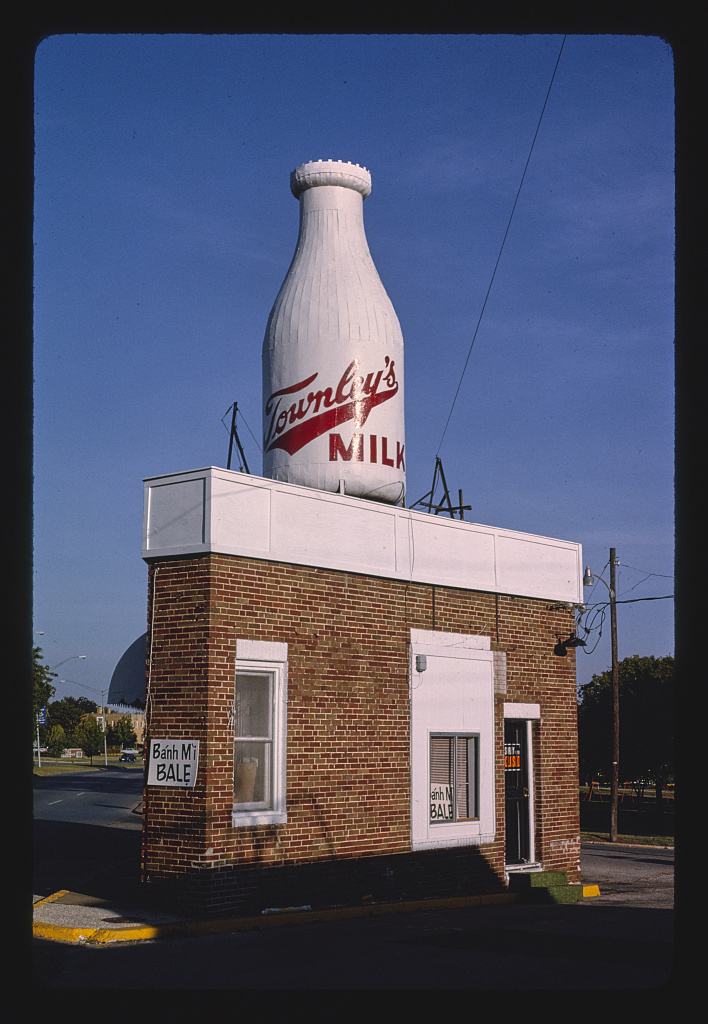
The building in 1993, when the milk bottle advertised Townley's Milk

The building was added to the National Register of Historic Places on March 5, 1998. The Saigon Baguette, a Vietnamese bánh mì shop, occupied the space for several years. In August 2014 it was announced that the building would be restored to its original appearance.

== See also ==
- Benewah Milk Bottle
- Guaranteed Pure Milk bottle
- Hood Milk Bottle
- The Bottle, Alabama
