= Leslie Bedford (educator) =

Museum educator

Leslie Bedford is the former Head of Exhibitions Research and Development and Director of the Comprehensive Japan Program Area at the Boston Children's Museum and Director of the Museum Leadership Program at the Bank Street College of Education. She is known for her "Teen Tokyo" exhibit at the Boston Children's Museum, and "Choosing to Participate" in which she collaborated with Facing History and Ourselves.

Bedford received a Master of Arts in Teaching from Harvard University and obtained her doctoral degree in Museum Studies from Union Institute and University. Today, Bedford is a retired museum professional and a current member of The Museum Group.

== Education and honors ==
- Vassar College, Bachelor of Arts in history, magna cum laude, 1962-1966.
- Harvard University Graduate School of Education, Master of Arts in teaching, 1967-1969.
- Senior Fulbright Research Fellow, Japan, 1986-1987.
- Museum Management Institute (Getty Leadership Institute), 1993.
- Union Institute and University, PhD in Museum Studies, 2004-2008.
- Senior Fulbright Research Fellow, Argentina, 2010.
- Residential Fellow, The Getty Center, Los Angeles, CA, 2015.

== Awards ==
- Bank Street College of Education Alumni Award Ida Karp Award, 2013

== Publications ==
=== Books ===
- Bedford, Leslie. "Cultural Learning: Two Models" in Boston Stories: The Children's Museum as a Model for Nonprofit Leadership. Boston, Massachusetts, 2013. 191-201.
- Bedford, Leslie. The Art of Museum Exhibitions: How Story and Imagination Create Aesthetic Experiences. Walnut Creek, CA: Left Coast Press, 2014.

=== Journals ===
- Bedford, Leslie. "Finding Common Ground." Curator: The Museum Journal 38, no. 1 (1995): 14-30.
- Bedford, Leslie. “Storytelling: The Real Work of Museums.” Curator: The Museum Journal 44, no. 1 (2001): 27–34.
- Bedford, Leslie. "La Orilla del Encanto: The Edge of Enchantment: Santo Domingo Cultural Center Oaxaca, Mexico." Curator: The Museum Journal 46, no. 4 (2003): 433-438.
- Bedford, Leslie. "Lost Cases, Recovered Lives: Suitcases from a State Hospital Attic: The New York State Museum at Albany." Curator: The Museum Journal 48, no. 2 (2005): 213-220.
- D. Lynn McRainey, Leslie Bedford, Daniel Spock and Andrew Anway. "Imagining the Possibilities." Exhibitionist (2007): 40-52.
- Bedford, Leslie. "A Conversation about Educational Leadership in Museums." The Journal of Museum Education 34, no. 2 (2009): 139-47.
- Bedford, Leslie. “Musing about Museums and Time.” Curator: The Museum Journal 55, no.4 (2012): 393-400.

=== Other ===
- Bedford, Leslie. “Working In The Subjunctive Mood: Imagination And Museums.” PhD diss. Union Institute and University, 2004.
