= Leslie Bedford (rugby union) =

English rugby union player

- Full name: Lawrence Leslie Bedford
- Born: 11 February 1903 Leeds, England
- Died: 25 November 1963 (aged 60) Harewood, Leeds, England

Rugby union career
- Position: Fullback
International career
Years	Team	Apps	(Points)
1931	England	2	(0)

Lawrence Leslie Bedford (11 February 1903 – 25 November 1963) was an English international rugby union player.

Born in Leeds, Bedford played his rugby for Headingley and made 32 representative appearances for Yorkshire. His two England caps came during the 1931 Five Nations, as a fullback for matches against Wales and Ireland at Twickenham, before being replaced by Eric Whiteley. He could also play centre.

Bedford served as president of Headingley and Yorkshire RFU.

== See also ==
- List of England national rugby union players
