= The Computer Museum, Boston =

Former computer museum in Boston, Massachusetts

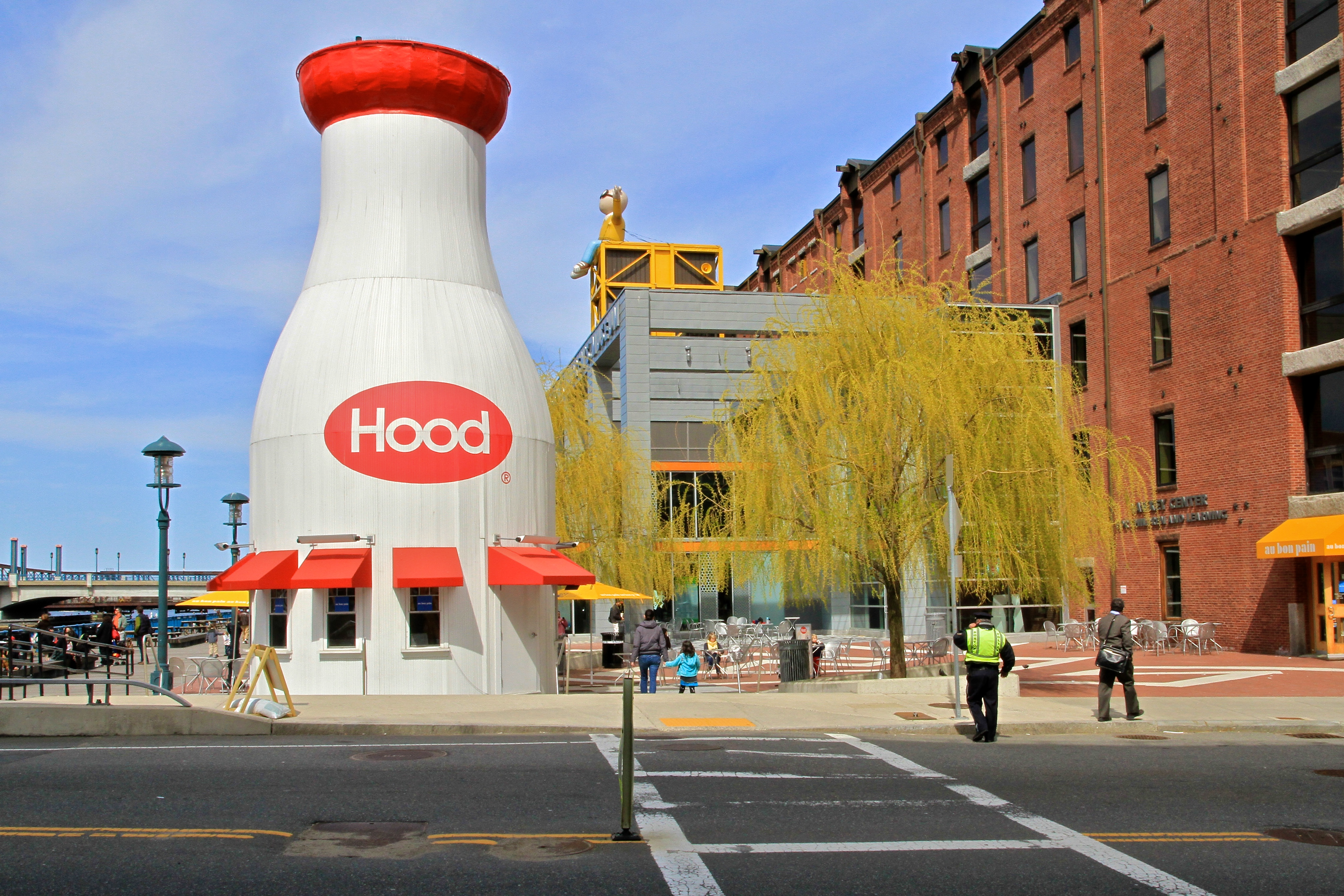
- Established: 1979
- Dissolved: 2000
- Location: Museum Wharf; Boston, Massachusetts
- Coordinates: 42.351845°N 71.04989°W
- Type: Computer museum

The Computer Museum was a Boston, Massachusetts, United States, museum that opened in 1979 and operated in three locations until 1999. It was once referred to as TCM and is sometimes called the Boston Computer Museum. When the museum closed and its space became part of Boston Children's Museum next door in 2000, much of its collection was sent to the Computer History Museum in California.

== History ==
=== The Digital Computer History Museum ===
The Digital Equipment Corporation (DEC) Museum Project began in 1975 with a display of circuit and memory hardware in a converted lobby closet of DEC's Main (Mill) Building 12 in Maynard, Massachusetts. In September 1979, with the assistance of Digital Equipment Corporation, Gordon and Gwen Bell founded the Digital Computer Museum in a former RCA building in Marlboro, Massachusetts. Though entirely funded by DEC and housed within a corporate facility, from its inception the museum's activities were altruistic, with an industry-wide, international preservation mission.

In spring 1982, the museum received non-profit charitable foundation status from the Internal Revenue Service. In Fall 1983, The Computer Museum, which had dropped "Digital" from its title, decided to relocate to Museum Wharf in downtown Boston, sharing a renovated wool warehouse with Boston Children's Museum. Oliver Strimpel, recruited from the Science Museum in London, was appointed to develop a major exhibit on computer graphics and image processing, later being appointed executive director in 1990.

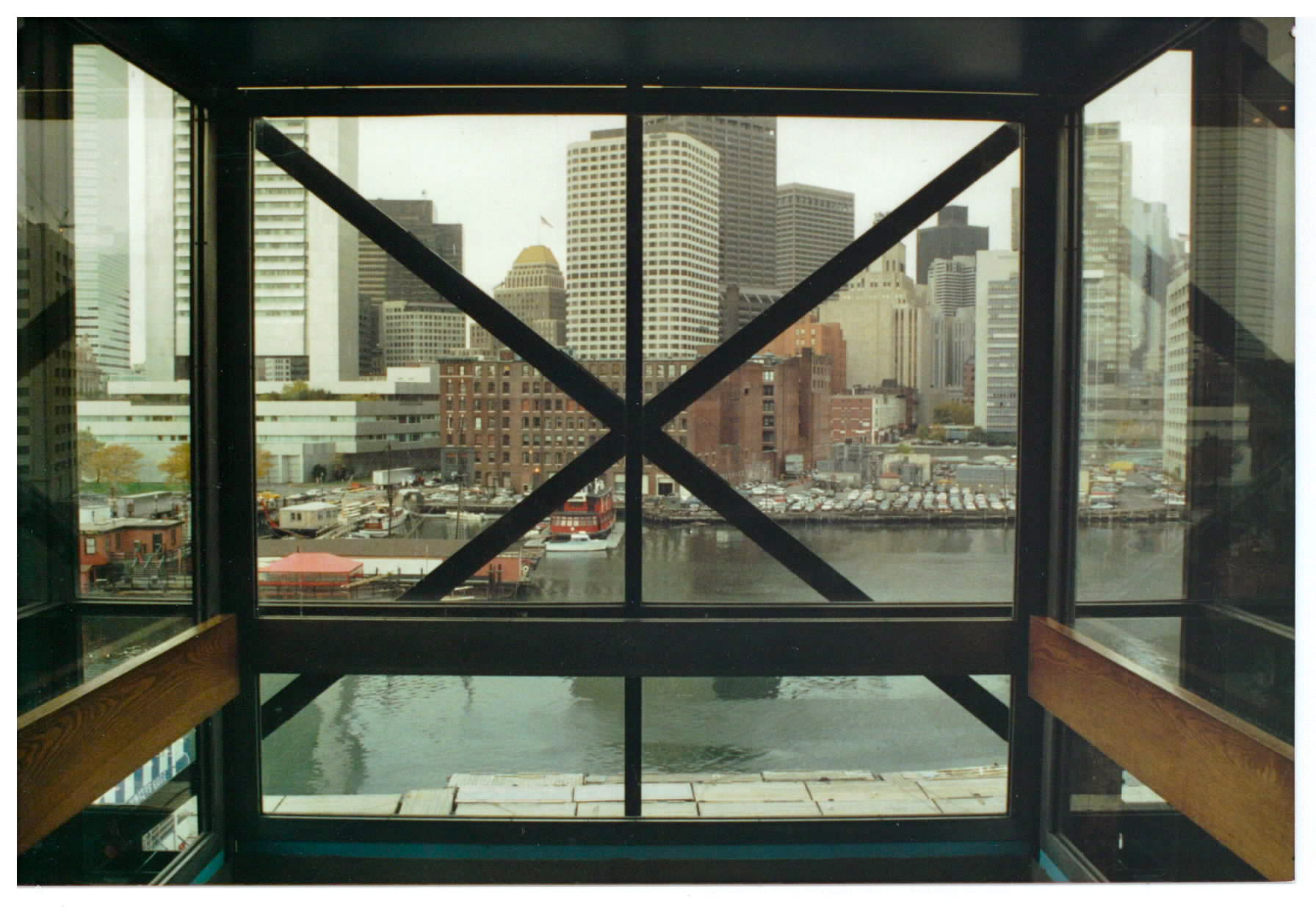
Downtown Boston from The Computer Museum elevator.

On November 13, 1984, the museum officially re-opened to the public at its new 53,000 square foot location. The initial set of exhibits featured the pioneering Whirlwind Computer, the SAGE computer room, an evolutionary series of computers built by Seymour Cray, and a 20-year timeline of computing developments that included many artifacts collected by Gordon Bell. Also among the opening exhibits was a permanent gallery devoted to the history, technology, and applications of digital imaging entitled The Computer and the Image.

Prior to all of this, DEC's Ken Olsen and Mitre Corporation's Robert Everett had, in 1973, "saved Whirlwind from the scrap heap" and "arranged to exhibit it at the Smithsonian." Olsen began warehousing other old computers, even as the Bells, independently, "were thinking about a computer museum" and collecting artifacts.

=== Computer History Museum (California) ===
While the majority of the museum's energies and funding were focused on the growing exhibitions and educational programs, the resources available for the historical collections remained flat. Though active collection of artifacts continued, there was a lack of suitable collections storage and study space. Furthermore, with the inexorable shift of the U.S. computer industry from Boston to the West Coast, the museum's Boston location became a handicap from the point of view of collecting as well as industry support. In 1996, a group of Computer Museum Board members established a division of the museum in Silicon Valley exclusively devoted to collecting and preserving the history of computing. First called The Computer Museum History Center, it was housed in a storage building near Hangar One at Moffett Field, California. In 2001, it changed its name to the Computer History Museum and acquired its own building in Mountain View, California, in 2002.

In 1999, the Computer Museum merged with the Museum of Science, Boston. When the museum closed as an independent entity in 2000, a few artifacts were moved to the Museum of Science for eventual exhibits. The historical artifact collection was sent to the Computer History Museum forming the base of the museum's collection.

An extensive archive of Computer Museum documents and videos of the history of the museum, formative memos at Digital Equipment Corporation and other materials was compiled by Gordon Bell and is now maintained by The Computer History Museum. Archive sections include: exhibits, with layouts and design documents; Pioneer Lecture Series Videos; Posters; The Computer Bowl; Museum Reports and Annual Reports; and Marketing material, such as brochures, guides, leaflets, press releases, and store catalogs. A Files section contains general documents of the founding and operation of the museum from the Internet Archive, the Computer History Museum, Gordon Bell and Gwen Bell, and Gardner Hendrie. An illustrated timeline weaves the sections together to provide an overview.

=== Governance ===
The Computer Museum was governed by a Board of Directors, which appointed the executive director and various board committees to oversee operations and other areas such as collections, exhibits, education, and development. The following served as chairman of the board: Kenneth H. Olsen (1982–1984), John William Poduska Sr. (1984–1988), Gardner C. Hendrie (1988–1993), Charles A. Zraket (1993–1997), and Lawrence Weber (1997–2000).

== Collections ==
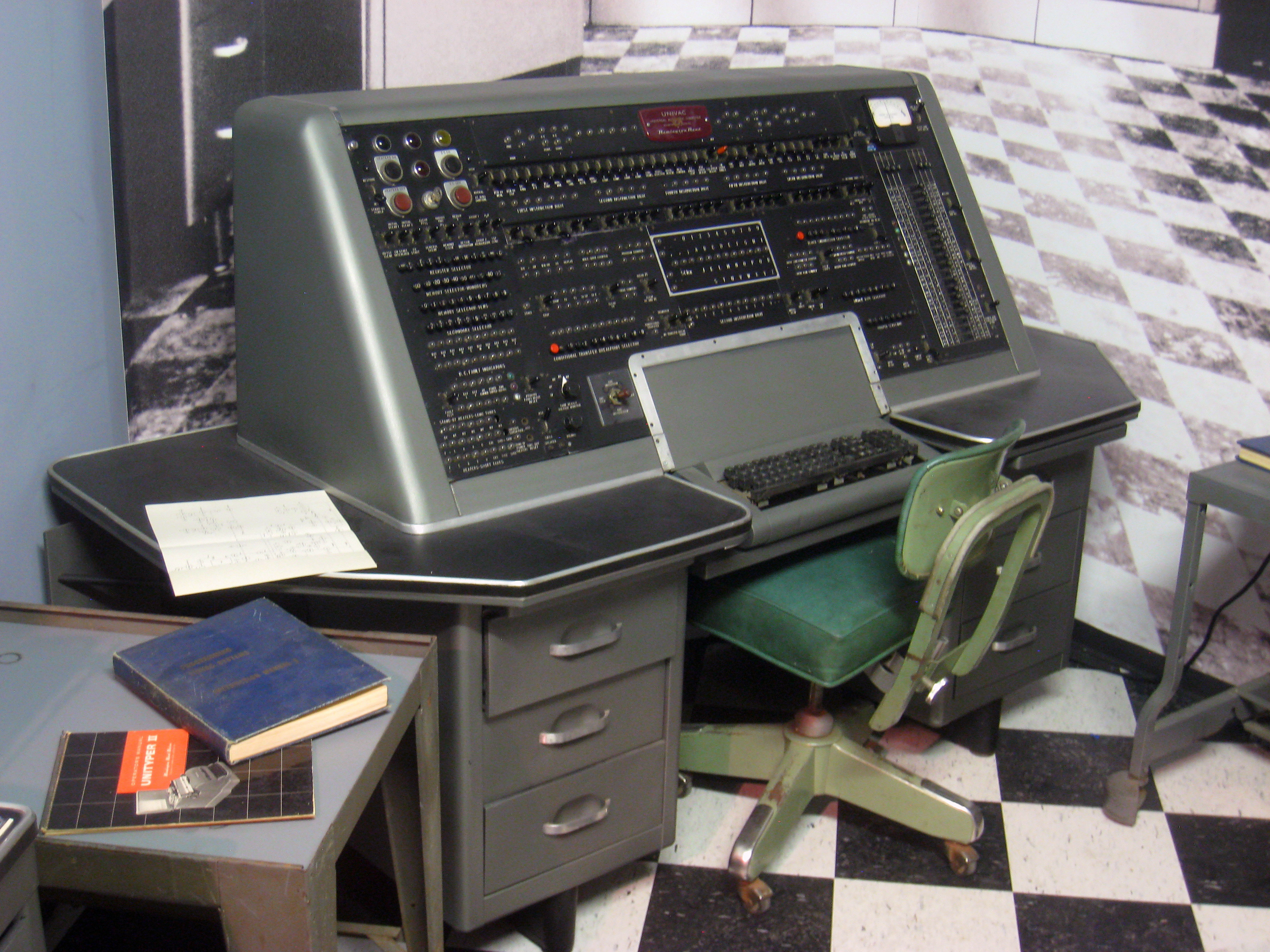
UNIVAC I control station.

The museum's collections were jump-started with the collections of Gordon and Gwen Bell, who had been actively collecting since the 1970s. To bring structure and discipline to collecting efforts, an acquisitions policy was developed in which computing materials were classified into Processor, Memory, and Switch categories, known as the PMS classification. The Transducer category was also added to cover input/output devices.

The museum actively collected artifacts throughout its history, though acquisition criteria became more selective over time owing to increasingly adherence to collecting criteria and severely limited storage space. Acquired artifacts ranged in size from a single chip to the multiple components of a single mainframe computer. In addition to artifacts, the museum collected images, film, and video.

Noteworthy early acquisitions included parts of Whirlwind 1, UNIVAC 1, the TX-0, a CPU from the Burroughs ILLIAC IV, IBM 7030 "Stretch", NASA Apollo Guidance Computer Prototype, a CDC 6600, a CRAY-1, PDP-1, PDP-8, EDSAC Storage Tube, Colossus pulley, and components of the Ferranti Atlas, and the Manchester Mark I.

In June 1984, the collection of artifacts and films numbered 900 cataloged items. Examples of acquisitions of computers in the preceding year included an Apple 1, Burroughs B-500, Digital Equipment Corp. PDP-1, Franklin Ace 100, and IBM SAGE: AN/FSQ-7 components. Several types of memory were acquired, including core memory, plasma cell memory, rope memory, selectron tube, magnetic cards, mercury delay line, and fixed-head drum. In the following years noteworthy acquisitions of computers included: Amdahl 470V/6, Apollo Domain DN100 workstation, Control Data Little Character, Data General Eclipse, Evans & Sutherland Line Drawing System-2, Osborne 1, SCELBI 8H minicomputer, and a Sinclair ZX80. To the nascent historical software collection, the first BASIC written for the Altair and VisiCalc Beta Test Version 0.1 was added.

Between Fall 1985 and Spring 1986, The museum sponsored the Early Model Personal Computer Contest. A call for the earliest personal computers netted 137 additions to the collections. The judges, Steve Wozniak, David Bunnell, and Oliver Strimpel awarded prizes for the earliest machines to John V. Blankenbaker for the Kenbak-1 (1972), Robert Pond for the Altair 8800, Lee Felsenstein for the prototype VDM-1, Don Lancaster for the prototype TVT-1, and Thi T. Truong for the Micral.

In 1986–7, the museum acquired 27 computers, including a CDC 1604, MIT AI Lab CADR, MIT Lincoln Lab LINC, Prime Computer Model 300, Research Machines 380Z, and a Xerox Alto II. As part of the development of the Smart Machines gallery, robot collecting was especially active, with robots such as Carnegie Mellon University Robotics Institute's Direct Drive Arm I and Pluto Rover, GM Consight-I Project materials, Johns Hopkins University Adaptive Machines Group's Beast, Naval Systems International Sea Rover, and Rehabilitation Institute of Pittsburgh Page Turning Robot. The collections of Subassemblies and Components, Memories, Calculating Devices and Transducers continued to expand as well.

Spurred by the difficulty of preserving a fast-evolving technology built by future-oriented engineers and entrepreneurs, the museum signed a joint collecting agreement with the Smithsonian Institution, National Museum of American History to collectively ensure that important computing artifacts would be preserved. Under this 1987 agreement, a common catalog and database of both museums' collections would be created.

== Permanent exhibitions ==
=== The Computer and the Image (1984) ===
In addition to exhibits principally directed to the history of computing, the museum re-opened in 1984 with a 4,000-square-foot gallery on digital image processing and computer graphics, entitled The Computer and the Image. The exhibits addressed the history of the field, the basic principles of digital image processing and image synthesis, and applications of the technologies. The exhibition featured historical artifacts, explanatory text and images, interactive exhibits, and a computer animation theater. Many of the exhibits were developed with the help of university and corporate research labs. The exhibition was developed under the direction of Oliver Strimpel with Geoff Dutton.

Digital image processing The gallery included the history, technology and applications of digital image processing. Possibly the first-ever digital image was acquired from Jet Propulsion Labs, consisting of hand-assembled colored strips of line-printer output from the Mariner 4 Mars probe (1965).

Hand-assembled digital image of the surface of Mars from the 1965 Mariner 4 fly-by.

Static exhibits included a display of early computer graphic input and output devices, examples of digital typography, and a holographic animation of U.S. demographic evolution.

Computer graphics Static exhibits included a display of early computer graphic input and output devices, examples of digital typography, the holographic animation American Graph Fleeting and A Visualizer's Bestiary, a tableau of real-world objects that have vexed programmers' attempts to render them realistically. Dynamic exhibits included: A Window full of Polygons depicting the view of downtown Boston that visitors see from the gallery on a large pen-plotter that renders the buildings' silhouettes with changing colors and patterns; an interactive Koch snowflake fractal generator; and the first computer game SPACEWAR! running on a PDP-1 and (more reliably) on a PC.

Realistic image synthesis Synthetic lighting and shading algorithms for models of three-dimensional objects have classically been tested by rendering of a teapot. In the early 1970s, Martin Newell, working at The University of Utah, decided to use his teapot as an object with which to test various modeling, lighting and shading techniques. In the summer of 1982, at the 1982 ACM SIGGRAPH conference, Martin Newell donated his original teapot to Oliver Strimpel, wryly noting the symbolism of one Englishman giving another Englishman a teapot to be preserved and displayed a stone's throw from the site of the Boston Tea Party revolt of 1773. The exhibit displayed Allan Newell's original ceramic teapot alongside an Adage frame buffer display of a Bézier model of it, both responding interactively to changes in lighting selected by museum visitors with switches.

Computer animation, an animation theater performed a program of pioneering computer-animated shorts, including several from Pixar, such as Luxo Jr.

=== Smart Machines (1987) ===
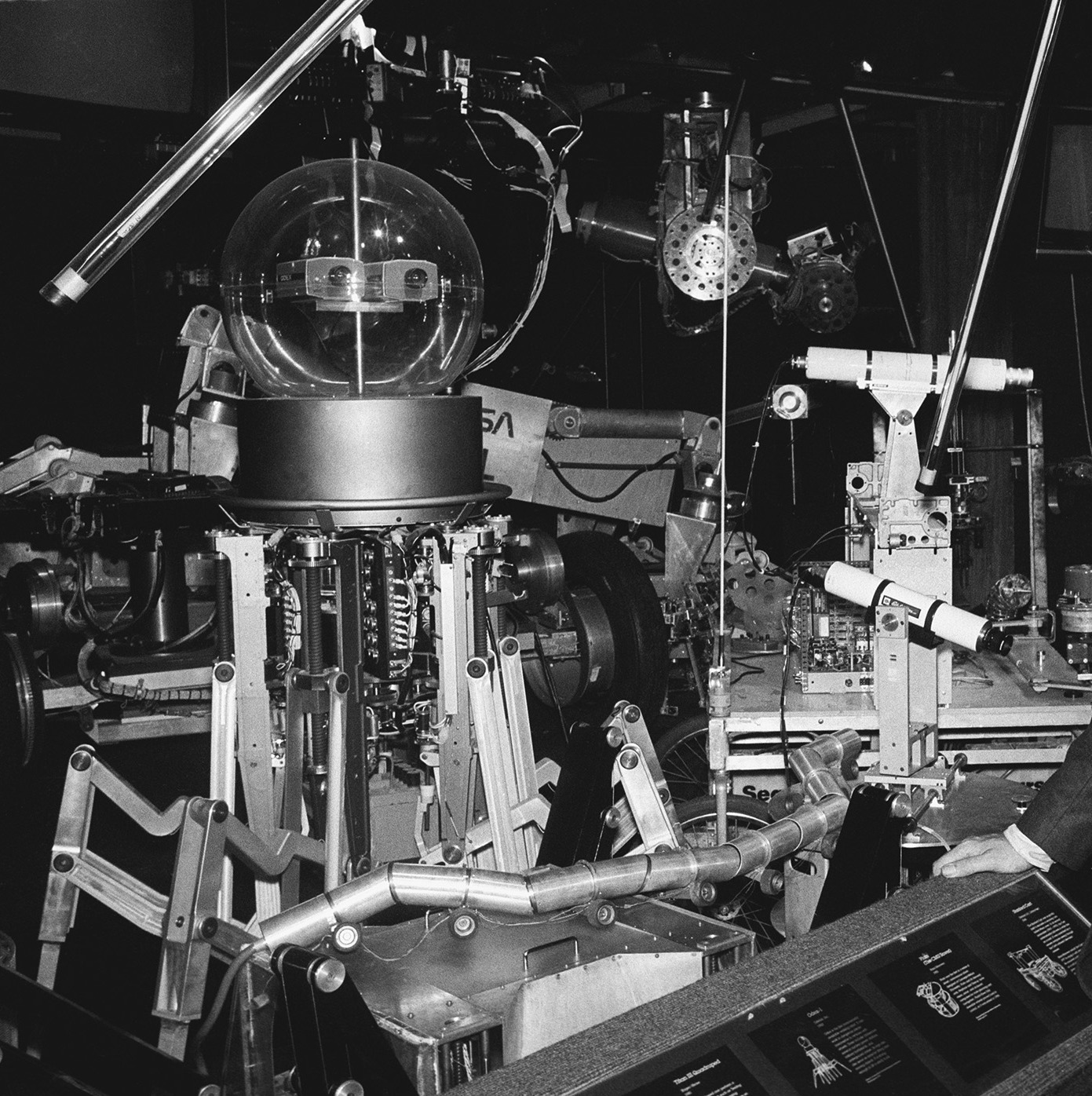
Robot Theater A collection of robots of historical interest exhibited in a multimedia theater in which the robots were highlighted and in some cases moved when featured in the theater's video program.

A permanent gallery devoted to the history and technology of artificial intelligence and robotics opened in 1987.

Knowledge-based systems Interactive exhibits focused on expert systems. Examples included a medical diagnosis system, a simple rule-based simulated bargaining store-keeper with whom visitors haggled over the price of a crate of strawberries, a computer composition system, and a system that plays tic-tac-toe according to a visitor-selected strategy.

Natural language understanding Visitors could sit at computers and ask questions of ELIZA, the automated psychotherapist that was noteworthy because despite its basic rule-based behavior, users became deeply engaged with it. In an interactive video disk system, visitors were invited to analyze the computer HAL's natural language capability in an excerpt of the Stanley Kubrick film 2001: A Space Odyssey.

Robot sensing Museum visitors could interact with four robot sensing modalities: vision, hearing, touch, and sonar. Vision: after arranging a set of simple shapes on a board, a vision system attempted to recognize them using edge detection. Hearing: this was exemplified by a speech recognition system. Touch: visitors touch a pressure-sensitive pad that outputs the distribution of pressure under their figures onto a display. Sonar: a ceiling-mounted sensor measured a visitor's height by bouncing a signal off the top of the head.

Robot Theater A collection of robots were arrayed inside a theater, each of which, when highlighted in the theater's video program, lit up and, in several cases, performed movements. Mobile robots included: Shakey, Prototype Mars Rover, the Stanford Cart, the quadruped Titan III from the Tokyo Institute of Technology, and a Denning Mobile Robot; robot arms included Unimate I, the Rancho and Stanford Arms and Orm from Stanford, the Direct Drive Arm-1 from Carnegie Mellon University, and the Tentacle Arm from MIT.

=== The Walk-Through Computer (1990, 1995) ===
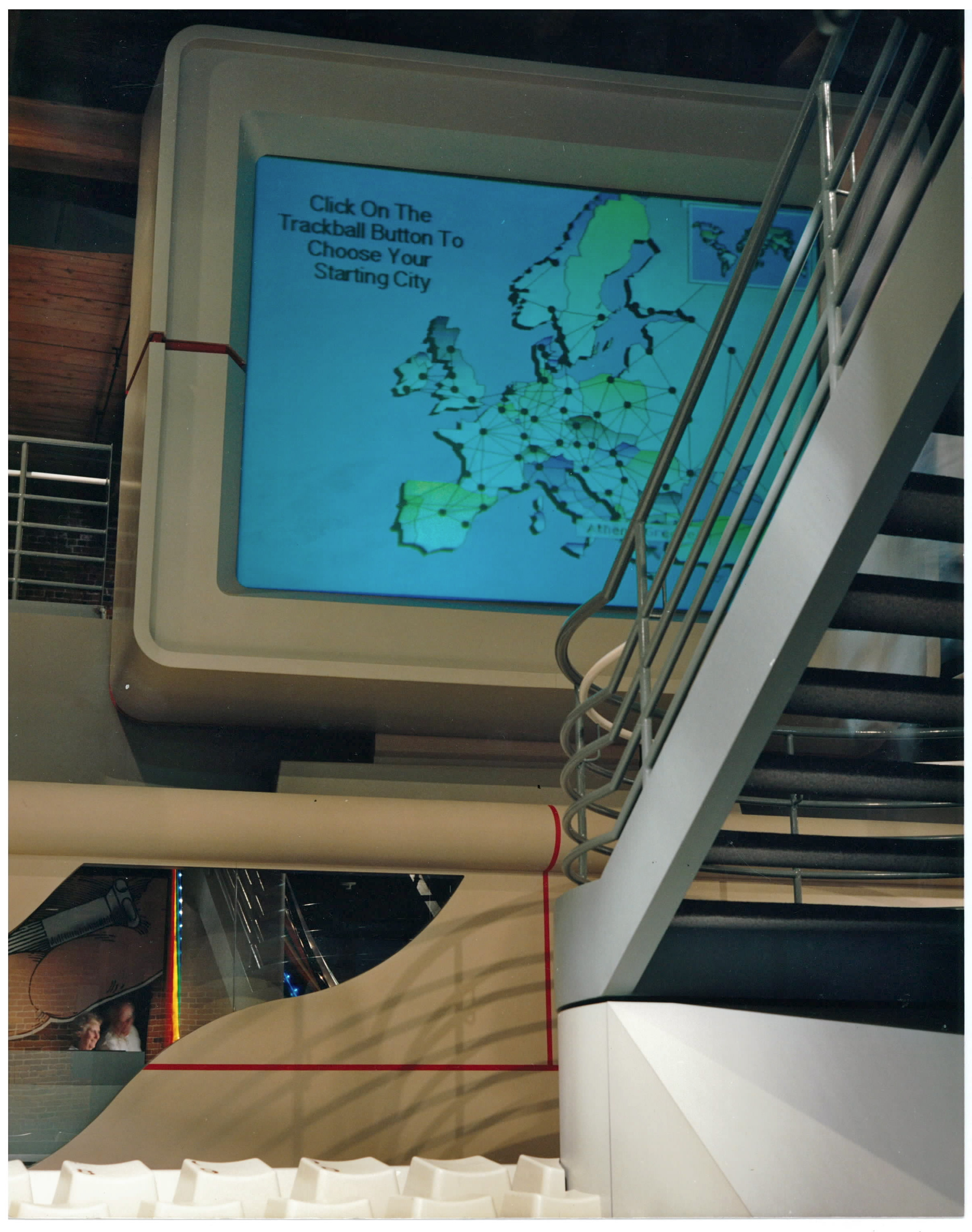
Giant monitor of two story-high Walk-Through Computer.

A two-story-high model of a personal computer, simulated to be working interactively.

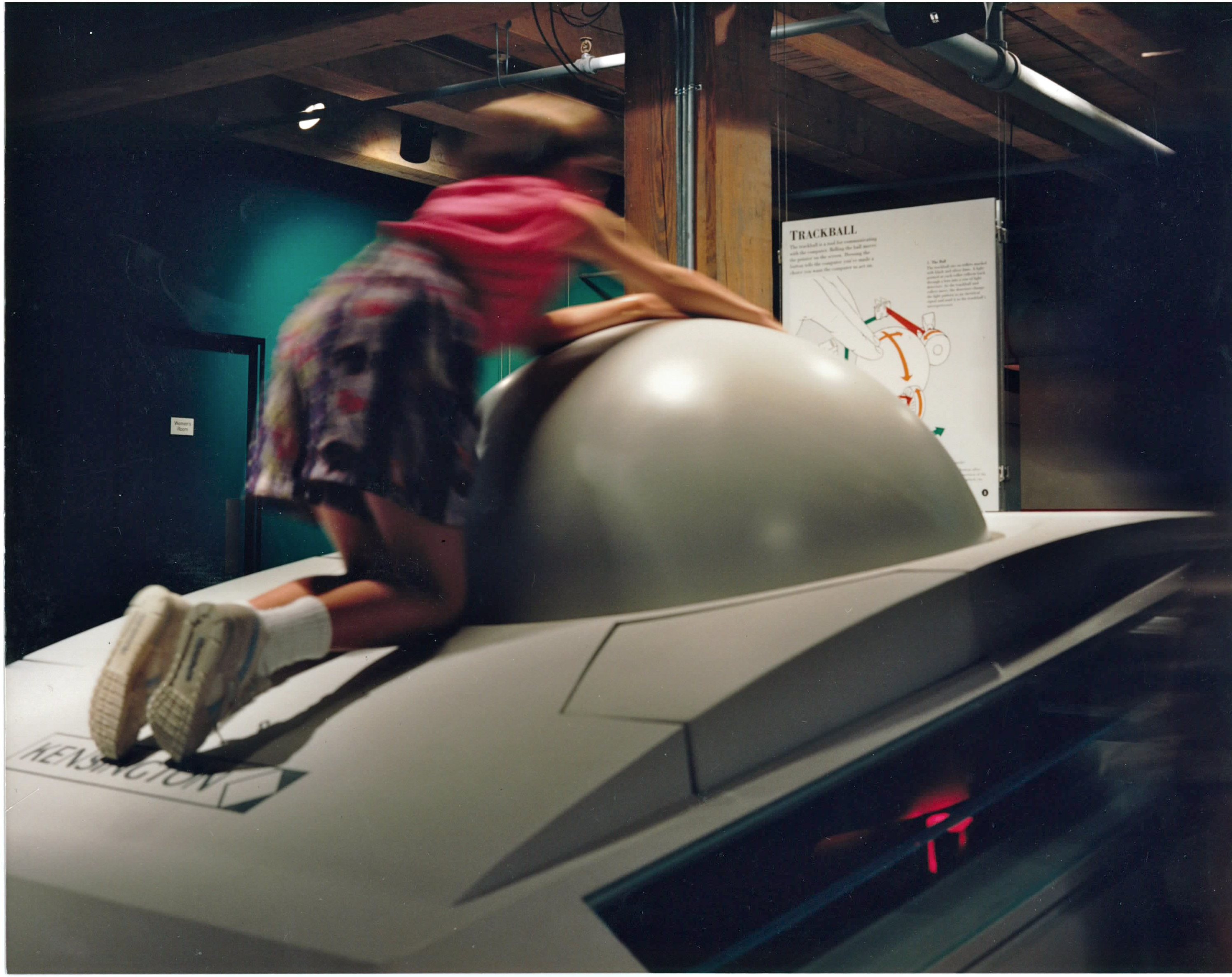
Giant working trackball used to control the World Traveler software

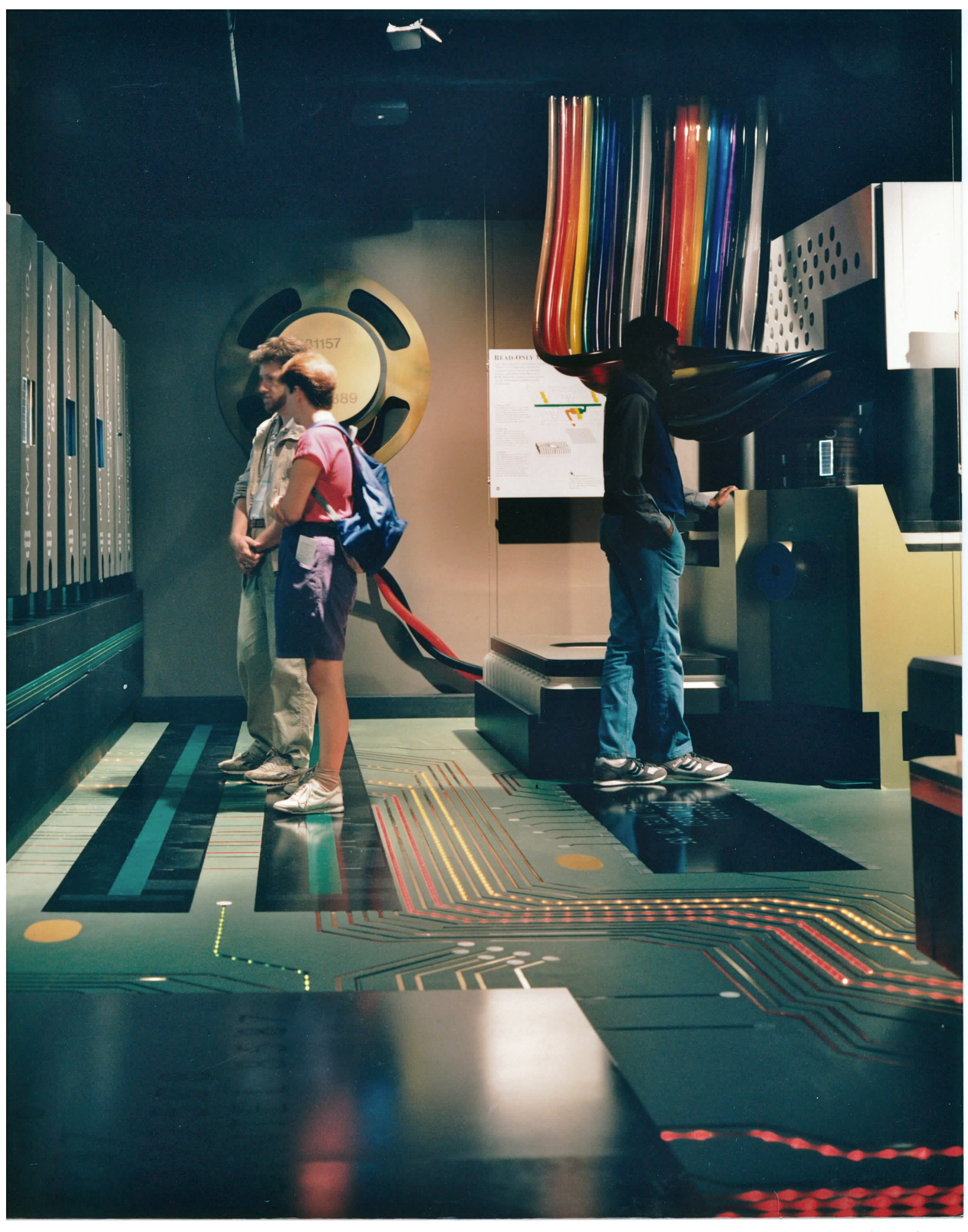
Inside the Walk-Through Computer: RAM on left, hard drive on right

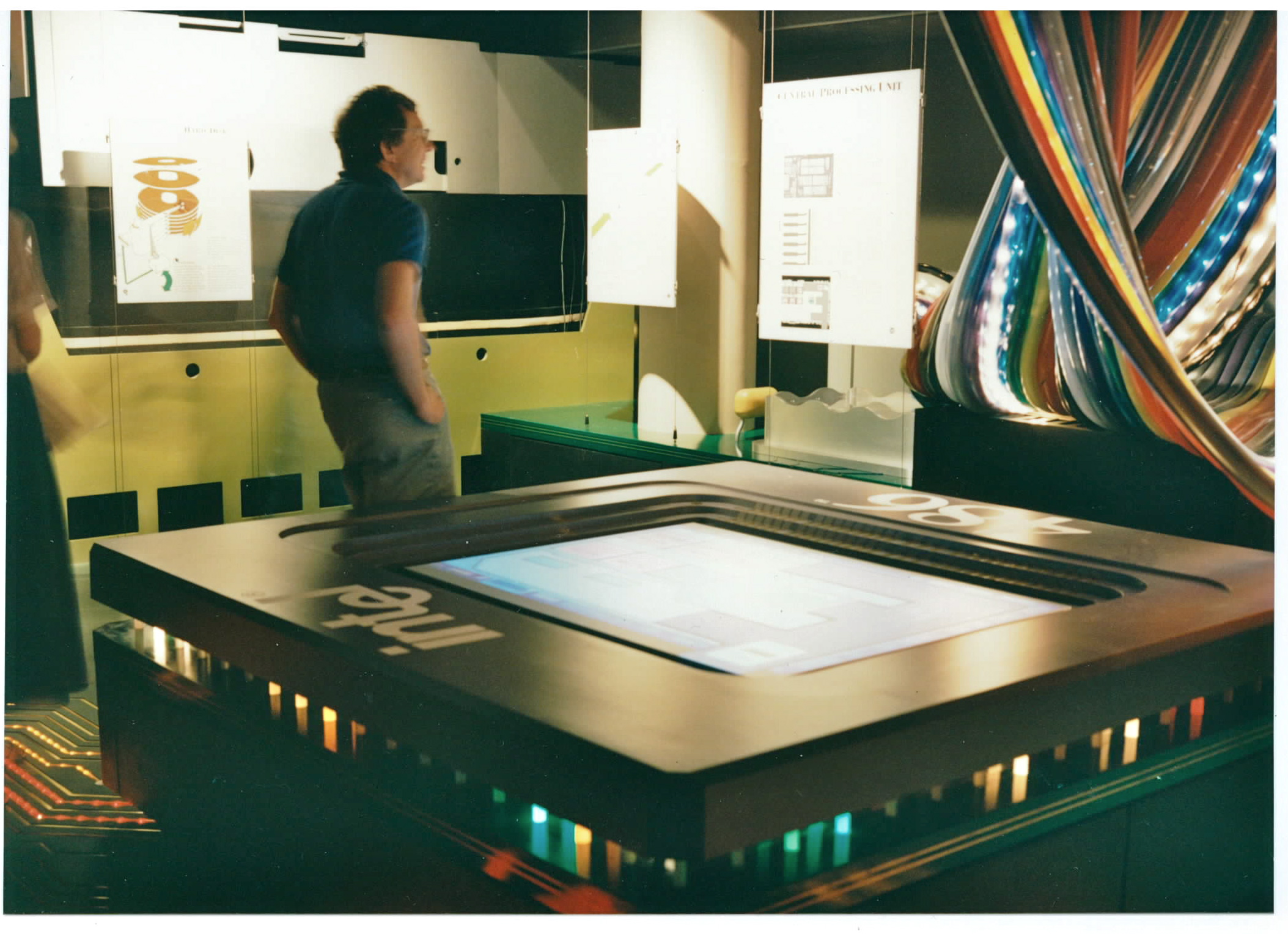
Inside The Walk-Through Computer: microprocessor with electron microscope imagery of working circuits; ribbon cable and RAM in the background.

The purpose of the exhibit was to show the anatomy of a computer and to explain how the various parts work and communicate with each other. Before entering the computer's chassis, visitors could roll a giant trackball to play "World Traveller" on the giant screen. Wall-sized graphics by David Macaulay and interactive exhibits explained how all kinds of information, from text, graphics, video, music, as well as computer programs can be represented as 1's and 0's. Inside the giant chassis, visitors walked between a wall-sized graphics card and memory card to the microprocessor, upon which a projected electron microscope imagery of a CPU's circuits in operation appeared. Further on, a RAM set of modules plugged into the motherboard included reveals showing electron microscope imagery of memory circuits, Peering into a mini-van sized hard drive, visitors could see read/write heads position themselves on either side of rotating platters. Richard Fowler was recruited from The Science Museum, London/Bradford, as exhibit designer. The exhibit garnered international publicity and more than doubled visitor traffic to the museum.

=== People and Computers: Milestones of a Revolution (1991) ===
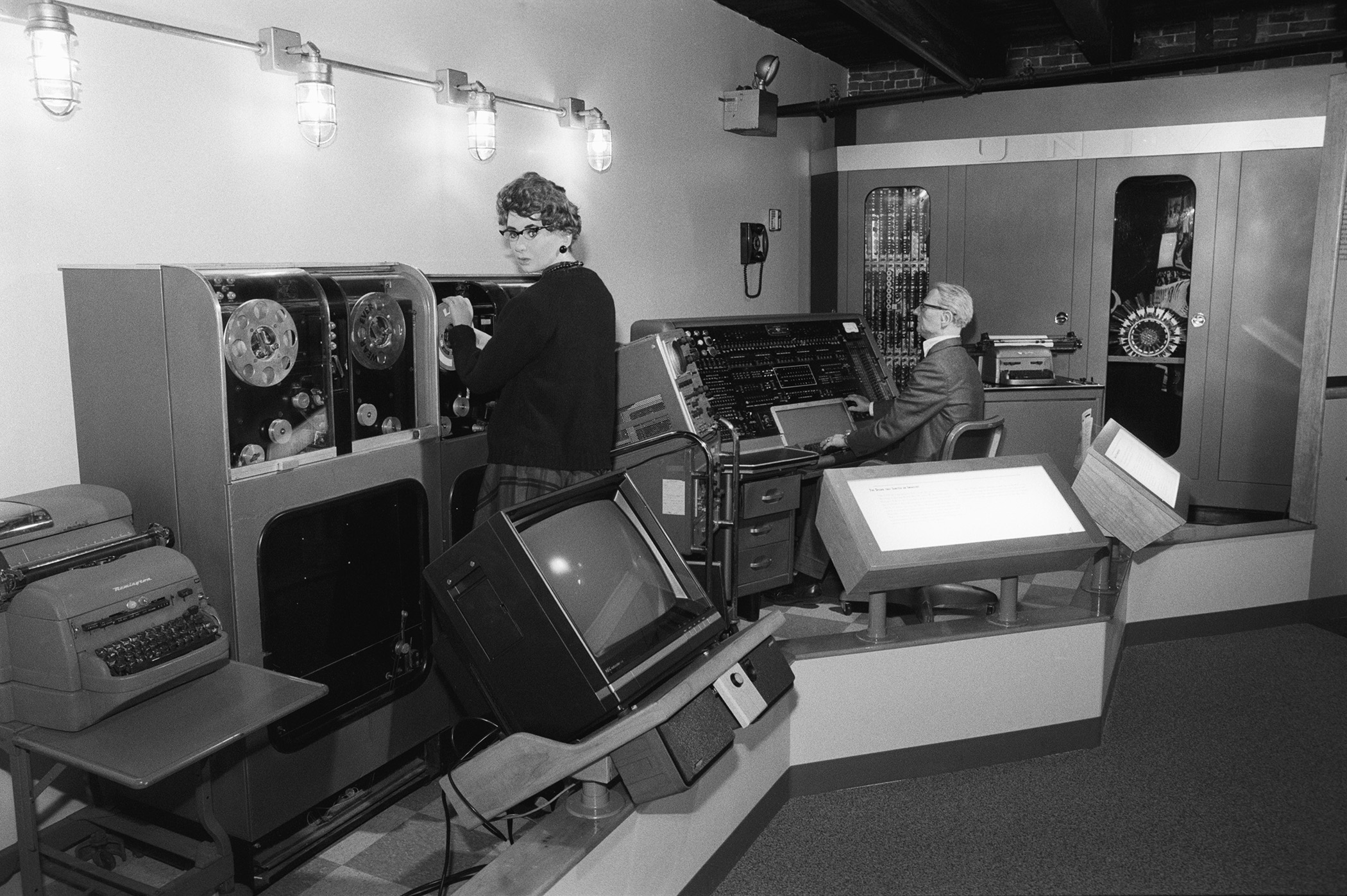
UNIVAC I: vignette exemplifying the birth of commercial computing in the Milestones of a Revolution exhibit at The Computer Museum, Boston.

Through a series of nine milestones portrayed with vignettes and interactive exhibits, this permanent exhibit portrayed computing from the punched card machines of the 1930s through the ubiquitous embedded microprocessors of the 1990s. The birth of electronic computer milestone featured a piece of the 1951 Whirlwind I computer with an interactive exhibit explaining core memory. Machines for big business were exemplified by a UNIVAC I installation and an IBM System 360.

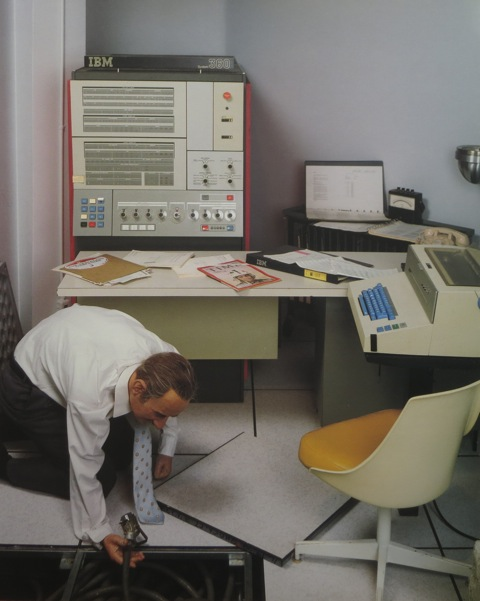
Milestones of a Revolution: an IBM 360 represents the coming of age of mainframe computers for commercial applications.

The emergence of computer programming languages was featured in a milestone showing how for the first time, different computers were programmed to accept a common language - COBOL. A 1970s vignette portrayed a PDP-8 minicomputer being used backstage to control theater lighting, and applications to scientific computer were shown with a CRAY-1 at the European Centre for Medium-Range Weather Forecasts. A student publishing her school newspaper using a Macintosh showed the beginning of personal computing.

=== Tools & Toys: The Amazing Personal Computer (1992) ===
The exhibition demonstrated eight application areas using some 40 computer stations. The first area, "Making Pictures" featured a Virtual Reality Chair among other interactive stations focusing on graphics. The other areas addressed writing, making sound, calculating, playing games, exploring information, and sharing ideas.

=== The Networked Planet (1994) ===
Against a backdrop of the explosive growth of the Internet, this 4,000-square-foot exhibit addressed the history, technology, and applications of the growing computer network infrastructure. Exhibits included an interactive live air traffic control display, a real-time view into stock exchange transactions, and several internet stations (not commonly found in public spaces at that time) with constantly changing selections of sample web sites to reveal the diversity of Internet applications.

=== The Virtual FishTank (1998) ===
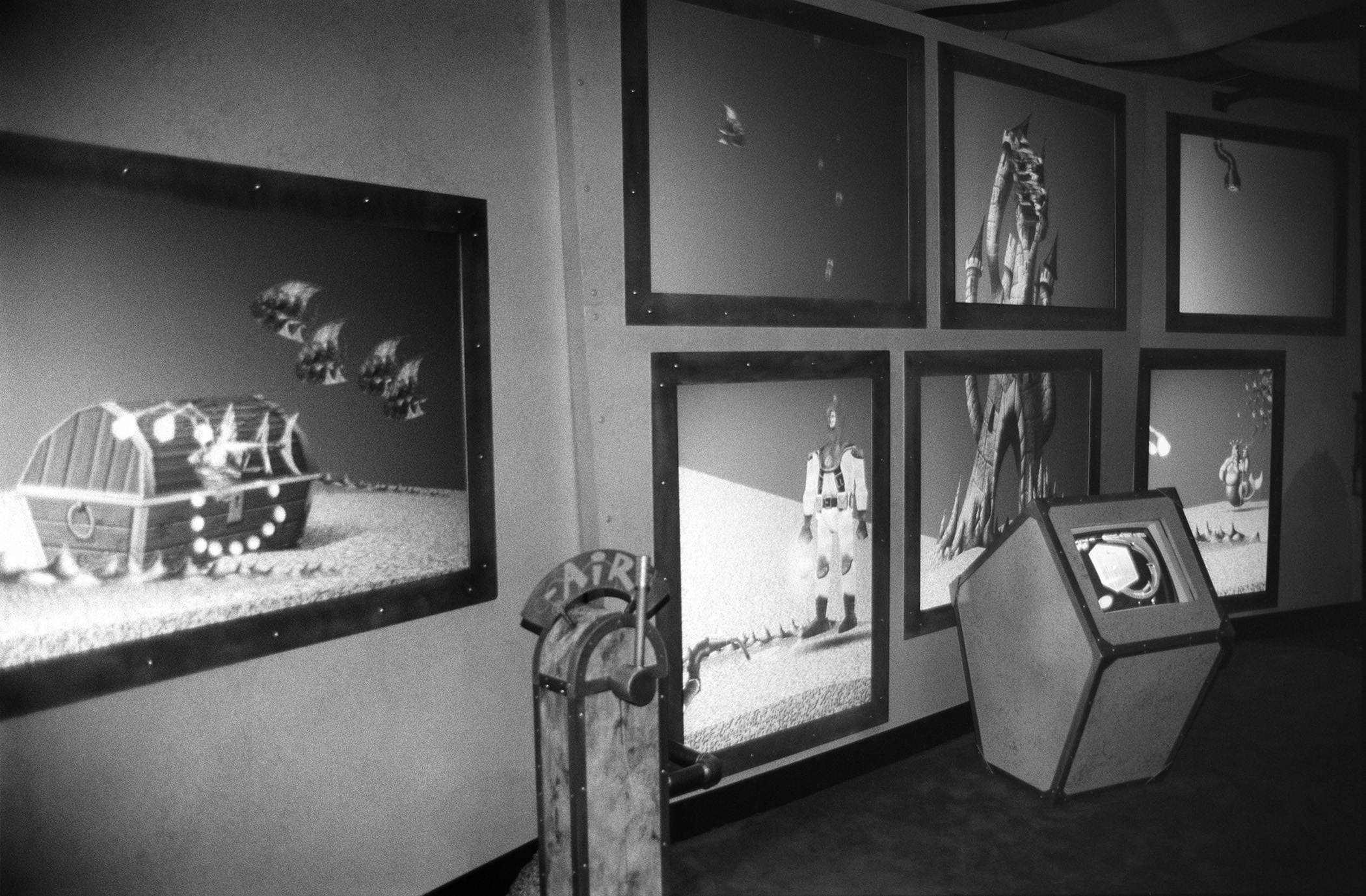
The Virtual FishTank, 1998, The Computer Museum, Boston.

In this 2,200 square-foot virtual undersea world, visitors used interactive stations located in front of a giant projection display to design their own virtual fish, and then release it into the simulated fishtank. Once in the tank, the fish behaved according to the behavioral rules chosen during its design, with surprising results. Together with a set of interactive stations, the exhibit, created in conjunction with the MIT Media Lab and Nearlife, Inc., aimed to reveal how simple behavioral rules lead to distinctive emergent behavior in complex systems such as traffic flows and city demographic distributions.

== Temporary and travelling exhibits ==
The museum developed temporary exhibits, some of which traveled to other museums.

- BYTE Magazine Covers 1985 – The original Robert Tinney illustrations.
- Colors of Chaos 1986 – Brightly colored computer graphic renditions of Julia Set and Mandelbrot Set fractals.
- On One Hand...Pocket Calculators Then and Now 1987 – From the abacus to the pocket calculator, the exhibit showed portable mechanical, electromechanical, and electronic devices. The exhibit traveled to a number of museums under the auspices of The Smithsonian travelling Exhibition Service.
- Terra Firma in Focus: The Art and Science of Digital Satellite Imagery 1988-9 – High resolution false-colored digital images from the SPOT satellite.
- Computer Art in Context: SIGGRAPH '89 Art Show – International juried selection of art involving the use of computers.
- The Computer in the Studio 1994 – Contemporary computer art developed in conjunction with the DeCordova Museum and Sculpture Park.
- The Robotic Artist: AARON in Living Color 1994 – Harold Cohen's artificial-intelligence based program autonomously painting color pictures representing rocks, plants, and people on a customized large format flat-bed plotter.
- Wizards and Their Wonders 1998 – Photographic portraits of inventors of the Computer Age by Louis Fabian Bachrach III

== Computer Clubhouse ==
In collaboration with the MIT Media Lab, The Computer Museum launched The Computer Clubhouse in 1993 to provide children from under-served inner city communities access to computers to learn how to use and program computers. Guided by adult mentors, children engaged in projects such as developing simulations, building and programming robots, and creating computer games. Spurred by a major grant from Intel Corp., a national and then international network of computer clubhouses was established. After the museum closed in 1999, the Clubhouse moved to the Museum of Science, Boston, which also served as the headquarters of The Computer Clubhouse Network.

== Computer Bowl ==
In 1988, the first annual Computer Bowl was held as a fund-raising event for The Computer Museum. The concept played upon rivalries between East Coast (especially Route 128 around Boston) and West Coast (mainly Silicon Valley) technology industries. It took the form of a live and televised (usually on Stewart Cheifet's PBS series Computer Chronicles) computer trivia contest between East and West Coast teams of industry and academic leaders, modeled somewhat on the College Bowl format. Between 1988 and the last Bowl held in 1998, team members included Marc Andreessen, John Doerr, Esther Dyson, Bill Gates, William "Bill" Joy, Mitchell Kapor, John Markoff, Patrick McGovern, Walt Mossberg, Nathan Myhrvold, Nicholas Negroponte, and John William Poduska.

== Special events ==
The museum hosted a variety of special events, mostly relating to recreational computing. Examples included computer chess tournaments, partial Turing tests, World Micromouse Contest, Core War contests, Computer Animation Festival, The First Internet Auction, and the 25th Anniversary of Computer Games.

== See also ==
- Computer History Museum, Mountain View, California
- List of computer museums
