= Boston Children's Museum =

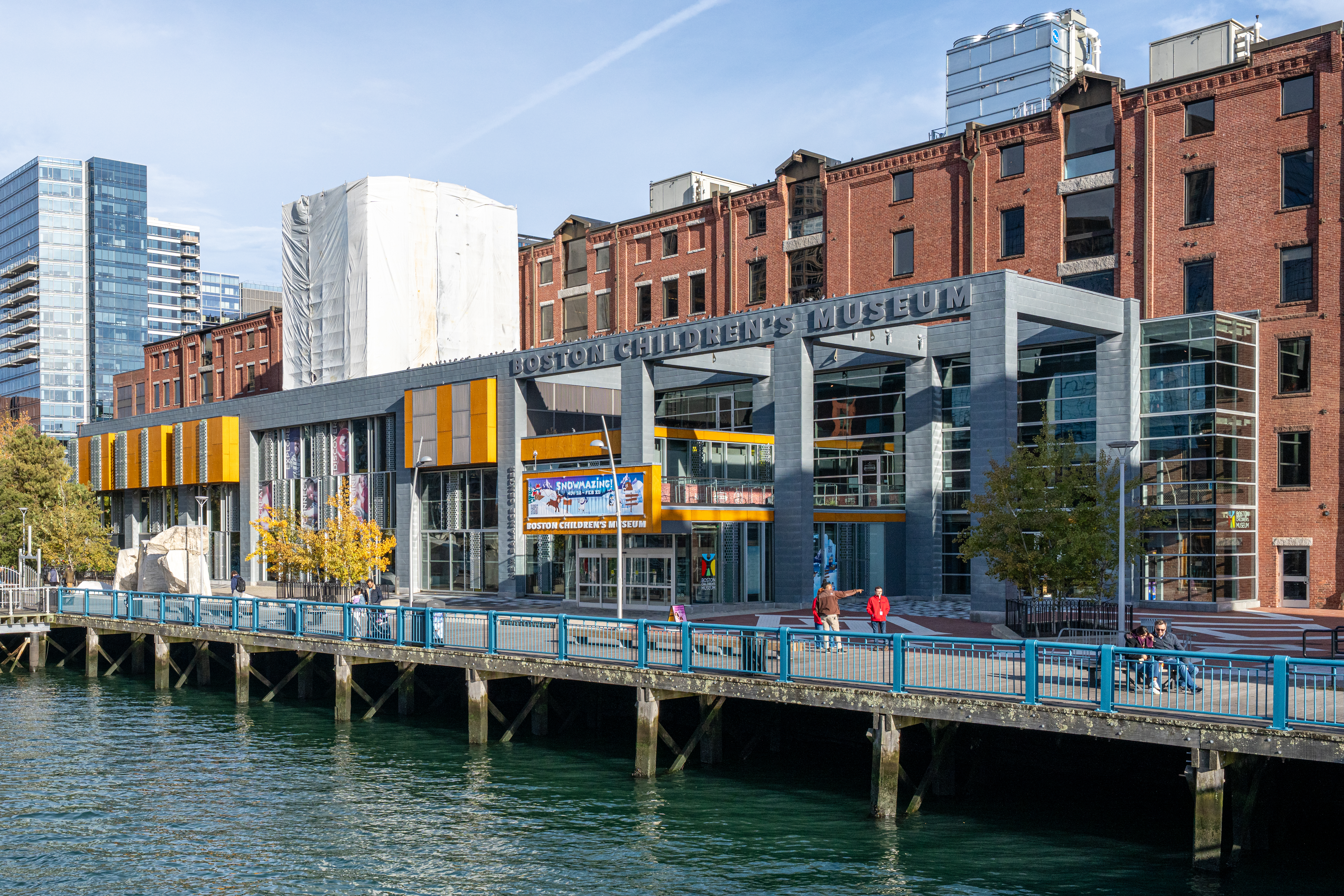
- Interactive map in Boston
- Former name: The Children's Museum of Boston
- Established: 1913
- Location: 308 Congress Street; Boston, Massachusetts
- Coordinates: 42.351867°N 71.049579°W
- Type: Children's museum
- Accreditation: American Alliance of Museums; Association of Children's Museums
- President: Carole Charnow
- Public transit access: Red Line at South Station Silver Line at Courthouse
- Website: bostonchildrensmuseum.org

Boston Children's Museum is a children's museum in Boston, Massachusetts, dedicated to the education of children. Located on Children's Wharf along the Fort Point Channel, Boston Children's Museum is the second oldest children's museum in the United States. It contains many activities meant to both amuse and educate young children.

== History ==
=== Early years ===
The idea for a children's museum in Boston developed in 1909 when several local science teachers founded the Science Teacher's Bureau. One of the Bureau's main goals was to create a museum:

it is planned to inaugurate at the same place, a Museum, local in its nature and to contain besides the natural objects, books, pictures, charts, lantern slides, etc., whatever else is helpful in the science work of the Grammar, High and Normal Schools. The specimens are to be attractively arranged and classified and the room open daily to children or anyone interested in such work.

The Women's Education Association also helped the Science Teacher's Bureau with the planning for the children's museum in Boston. After four years of planning, The Children's Museum officially opened on August 1, 1913, at the Pinebank Mansion located along Jamaica Pond in Olmsted Park in Boston's Jamaica Plain neighborhood. It is the second oldest children's museum in the United States. The first museum contained two cases: one devoted to birds and the other to minerals and shells. The exhibits were kept at children's eye level, used simple language, and complemented the lessons taught in school. George Hunt Barton served as the museum's first president. Delia Isabel Griffin was appointed the first curator of the museum.

During the early years of the museum, leaders created branch museums throughout Boston so that children in other parts of the city could experience the museum as well. The first branch museums were located in schools, including the Quincy School on Tyler Street, the Abraham Lincoln School, the Samuel Adams School in East Boston, and the Norcross School in South Boston. These museums usually consisted of a single room that contained a case of some specimens. In 1919, the Children's Museum opened a much larger branch museum in the Barnard Memorial Building on Warrenton Street. Known as the Barnard Memorial Branch Museum, it contained a number of different exhibits throughout the building. The Barnard branch closed in 1926.

In 1935, the museum's lease on the Pinebank Mansion expired, and leaders decided that they needed a bigger space for the museum. They learned that a property was available a few blocks away on 60 Burroughs Street on the Jamaica Way and purchased the building from the Mitton family. The Children's Museum opened at its new location on November 18, 1936.

Michael Spock, son of Dr. Benjamin Spock, served as the director of the museum from 1962 to 1985. Under Spock's leadership, Boston Children's Museum introduced the idea of "hands-on learning" to the museum field, and the first interactive exhibit in the museum, "What's Inside," was created during his term. In 1972 the museum was accredited by the American Alliance of Museums. The Computer Center at the Children's museum had a working, modified UNIX system running on a PDP-11/40 with "kidproofed" hardware and software in August 1974.

=== Move to Fort Point Channel ===
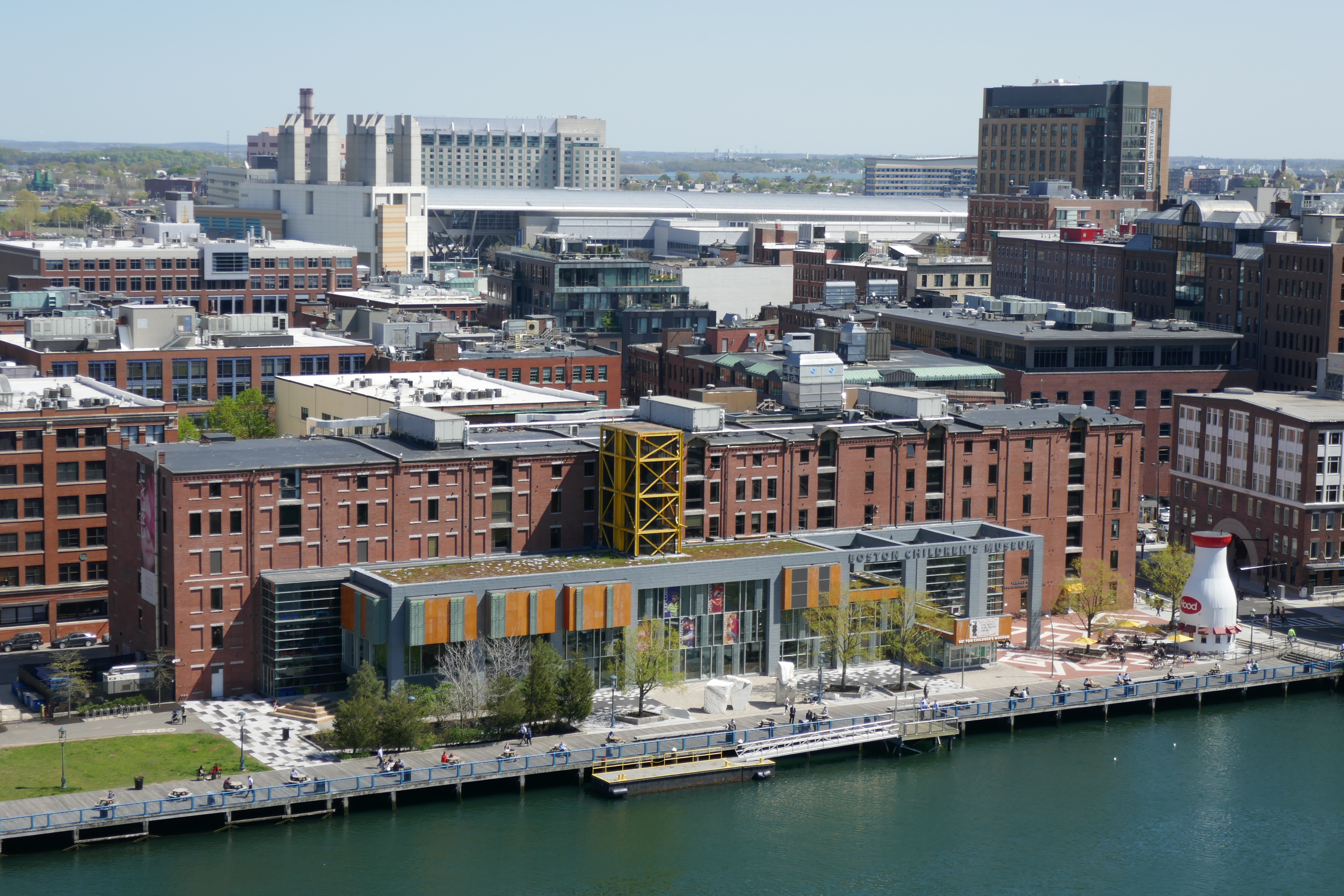
The Boston Children's Museum, on Children's Wharf

In 1979 Boston Children's Museum moved into half of an empty wool warehouse on the Fort Point Channel in order to gain more space and become more accessible to people in Boston. (From 1984 through 2000, the other half of the building was occupied by The Computer Museum.) The following year, Boston's Japanese sister city Kyoto donated a Japanese silk merchant's house to the museum. The house, known as Kyo-no-Machiya, is still one of the landmark exhibits at Boston Children's Museum.

In 1986, Kenneth Brecher became the director of the museum. During his term, Kids Bridge, a groundbreaking exhibit on cultural diversity and racism, opened at the museum. The exhibit later moved to the Smithsonian Institution before embarking on a 3-year tour around the United States.

Lou Casagrande served as the museum's president and CEO from 1994 to 2009. The museum opened several important exhibits during Casagrande's term including Five Friends from Japan, access/Ability, and Boston Black: A City Connects. In 2004, The Children's Museum of Boston officially became Boston Children's Museum.

In April 2006, the museum broke ground on a $47-million expansion and renovation project designed by Cambridge Seven Associates and closed for four months at the beginning of 2007 to complete the project. The project added a 23,000-square-foot (2,100 m2), glass-walled enclosure to the front of the museum, a new theater, new exhibits, and a newly landscaped park. The museum also focused on making its renovation "green" and is the first green museum in Boston. It reopened on April 14, 2007. In early 2008 Boston Children's Museum received LEED Gold certification from the U.S. Green Building Council.

In 2013, Boston Children's Museum was one of ten recipients of the National Medal for Museum and Library Service. The nation's highest honor conferred on museums and libraries for service to the community, the National Medal celebrates institutions that make a difference for individuals, families, and communities.

Carole Charnow is the museum's president and chief executive officer.

== Permanent exhibits ==
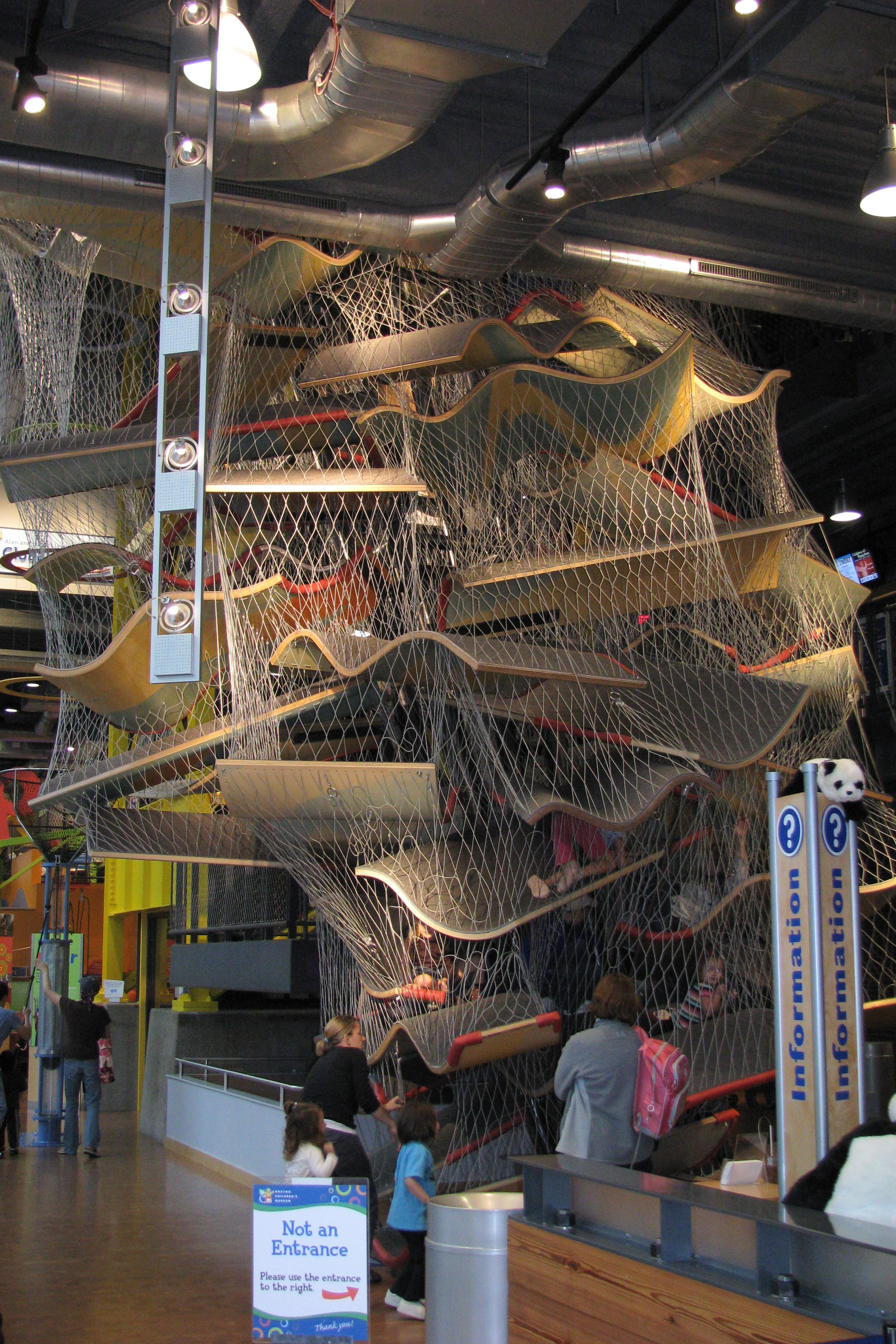
The New Balance Climb at Boston Children's Museum

- Arthur & Friends: The exhibit features the characters from Marc Brown's books and the television series. Children can learn and play in the Read Family Kitchen, Mr. Ratburn's Classroom, and the Backyard Sleepover.
- Art Studio: The Art Studio is a place where children and families can create art together.
- Boston Black ... A City Connects: This exhibit explores Boston's Black community and its history and diversity. Children can decorate and ride on a Carnival float, shop at a Dominican store, learn about hairstyles at Joe's Barber Shop and African Queen Beauty Salon, and dance to Cape Verdean beats.
- The Common: The Common is a central area where visitors can experience light shows, musical chairs, a gigantic checkers game, and many other activities. The Common is also used for gatherings.
- Construction Zone: Inspired by the Big Dig, the Construction Zone gives visitors a chance to ride a Bobcat, play with trucks, and use jackhammers.
- Countdown to Kindergarten!: This model classroom welcomes kids to take part in a typical Kindergarten experience while adults can ask staff "teachers" questions they may have about Kindergarten.
- Explore•a•Saurus: The exhibit invites children and families to assume the role of scientist and explore the evidence, the science, and the features that make dinosaurs so compelling.
- Japanese House: The Japanese House is a real two-story townhouse from Kyoto, Japan, Boston's Japanese sister city. Visitors can learn about Japanese family life, culture, art, architecture, and seasonal events at the exhibit.
- Johnny's Workbench: Visitors are able to work with hand tools and natural materials at this exhibit. The exhibit was recently updated, and now visitors are able to create a small woodworking project to take home.
- KEVA Planks: KEVA Planks introduce children to problem solving and abstract thinking, and foundational concepts of mathematics, physics, and design.
- Kid Power: This exhibit teaches visitors how to live healthier lives by eating right and exercising.
- KidStage: At KidStage, visitors can watch and often participate in performances on the kid-sized stage. The exhibit introduces children to the performing arts—music, singing, dance, and comedy.
- New Balance Foundation Climb: The New Balance Foundation Climb is a three-story climbing structure located in the front of the museum. It was designed by Tom Luckey.
- Peep's World: Peep's World recreates the world from the WGBH series Peep and the Big Wide World and teaches young children science skills.
- PlaySpace: PlaySpace is for the museum's youngest visitors—children between the ages of 0–3 years. Children can explore a tree house climber, a toy train set, and a "messy activities" area. The exhibit also includes an crawlers-only area with soft mats and other objects to lie and climb on.
- Science Playground: Visitors can learn about the natural world in "Investigate," discover the laws of motion in "Raceways," or play with bubbles in "Bubbles."

== Collections ==
Boston Children's Museum has an extensive collection of objects from around the world. Most of the objects were donated to the museum. The museum currently has more than 50,000 objects, but most are kept in storage away from visitor areas. Visitors can see some of the objects in the Native American Study Storage area and the Japanese Study Storage area on the third floor of the museum and in window displays throughout the museum. The museum also lends objects to schools through its Educational Kits Program.

== Influence ==
Boston Children's Museum has inspired both the Museo Pambata in Manila, Philippines, and Le Musée des Enfants in Brussels, Belgium.

== Building ==
The museum is housed in a renovated industrial building. A large glass elevator provides access to the upper floors of the museum. The elevator was once located outside the museum but is now inside due to the museum's 2006–2007 expansion and renovation. The ground floor houses the museum's admissions area and a gift shop. Outside, a large deck overlooks the Fort Point Channel and Boston Harbor and hosts the landmark Hood Milk Bottle.

== Hood Milk Bottle ==
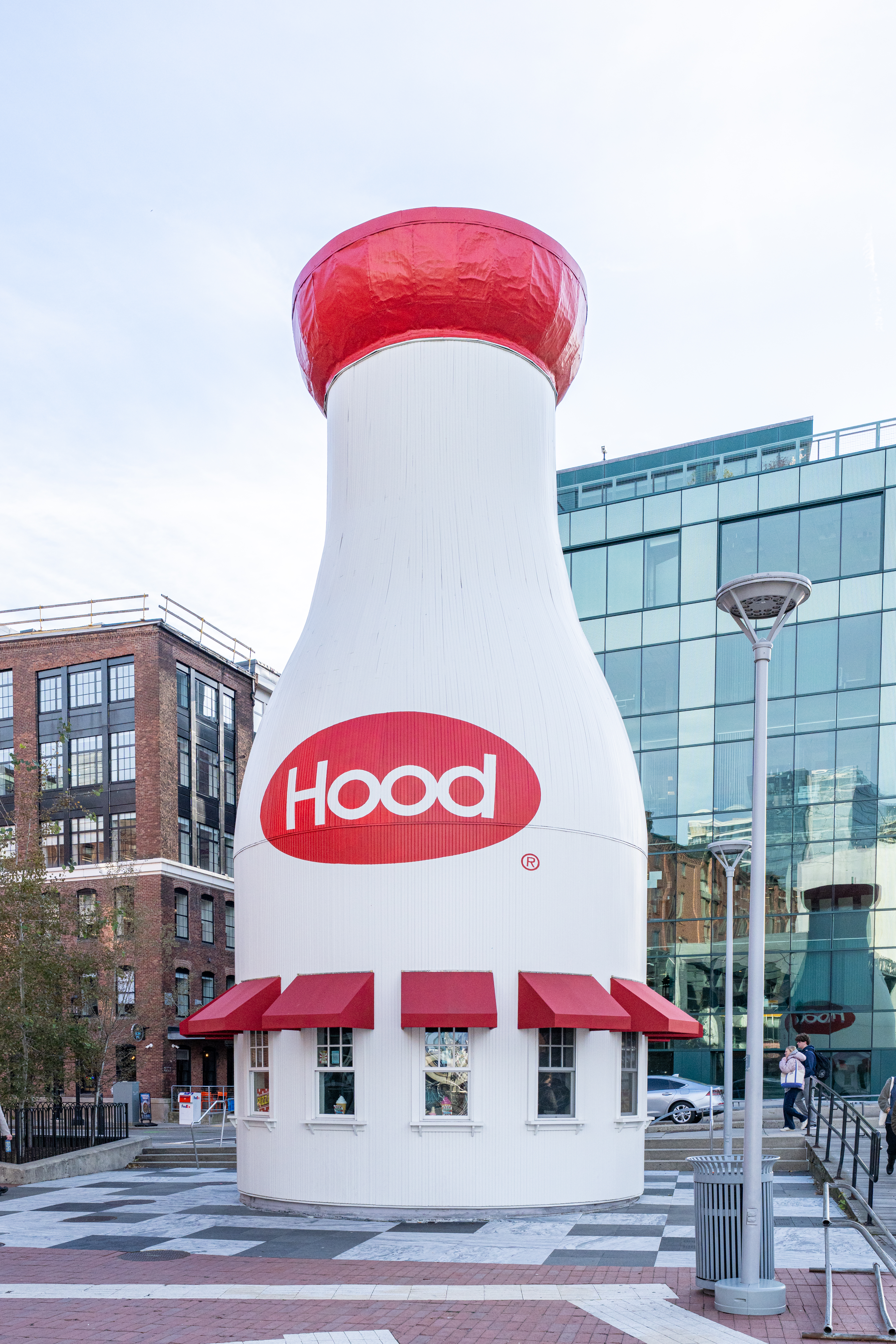
The Hood Milk Bottle in front of Boston Children's Museum

The Hood Milk Bottle is located on the Hood Milk Bottle Plaza in front of Boston Children's Museum. It has been located on this spot since April 20, 1977, when Hood shipped the bottle by ferry to Boston on a voyage it called the "Great Bottle Sail." The structure is 40 feet (12 m) tall, 18 feet (5.5 m) in diameter and weighs 15,000 pounds. If it were a real milk bottle, it would hold 58,620 gallons (221,900 L) of milk.

The bottle underwent extensive renovations. In fall 2006, the bottle was "uncapped"—its original top half was sliced off and preserved—so that its base could be moved slightly and rebuilt on the new Hood Milk Bottle Plaza. A renovated bottle was put back in place and officially re-dedicated by Boston Mayor Thomas Menino on April 20, 2007, thirty years to the day after it was moved to Children's Wharf.

The Hood Milk Bottle was originally located on the banks of the Three Mile River on Winthrop Street (Route 44) in Taunton, Massachusetts. Arthur Gagner built the structure in 1933 to sell homemade ice cream next to his store. It was one of the first fast-food drive-in restaurants in the United States and was built using the "Coney Island" style of architecture. Gagner sold the bottle to the Sankey family in 1943. It was abandoned in 1967. The bottle stood vacant for ten years until H.P. Hood and Sons, Inc. was persuaded to buy it and give it to Boston Children's Museum in 1977.

Movies are sometimes projected onto the side of the structure for museum events.

== See also ==
- Benewah Milk Bottle
- Children's Wharf
- Guaranteed Pure Milk bottle
- Milk Bottle Grocery
- List of museums in Massachusetts
