= Fort Point, Boston =

Neighborhood of Boston, Massachusetts, United States

Coordinates: 42.348506°N 71.050364°W

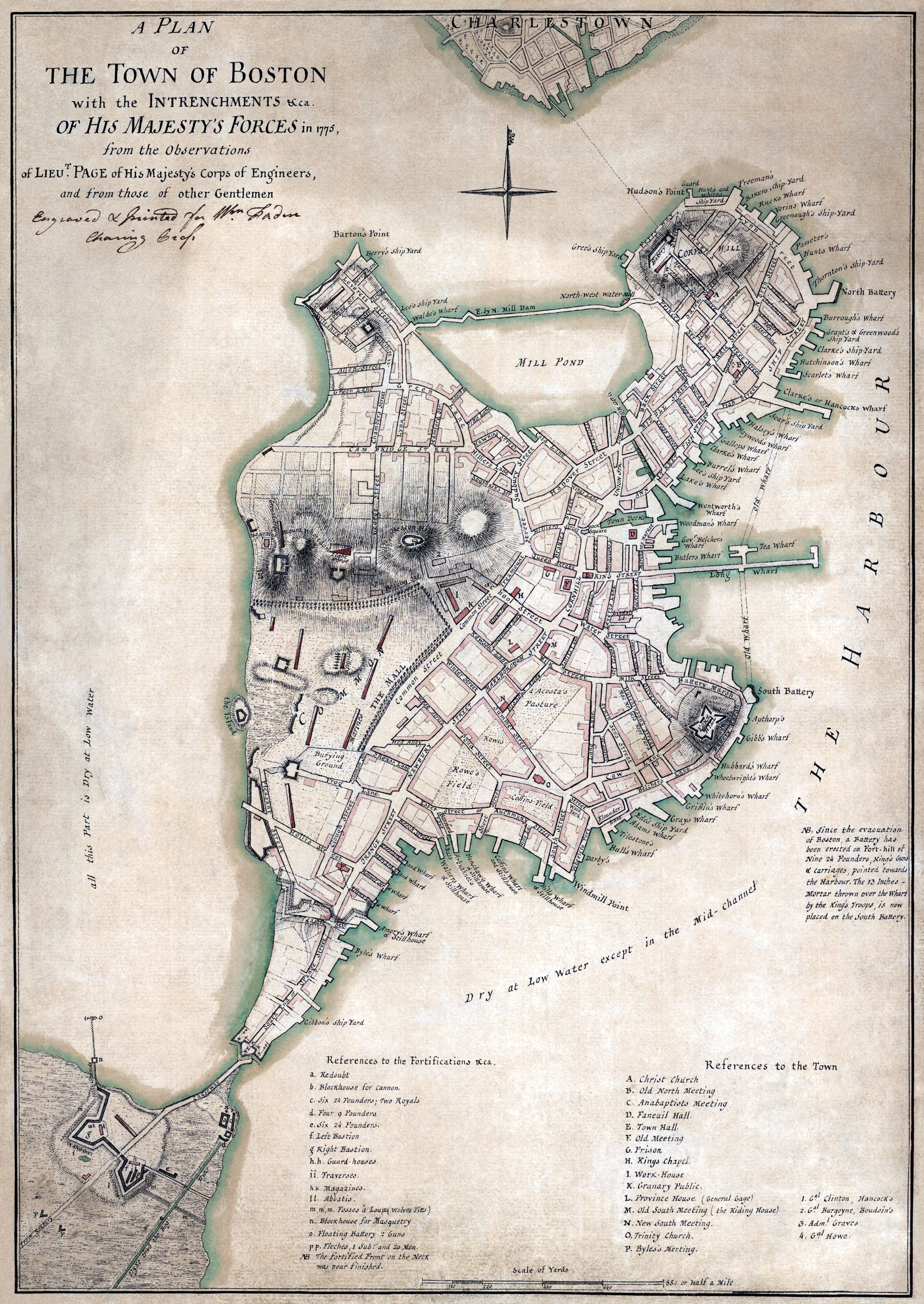
1775 British map showing Fort Hill in the right-center

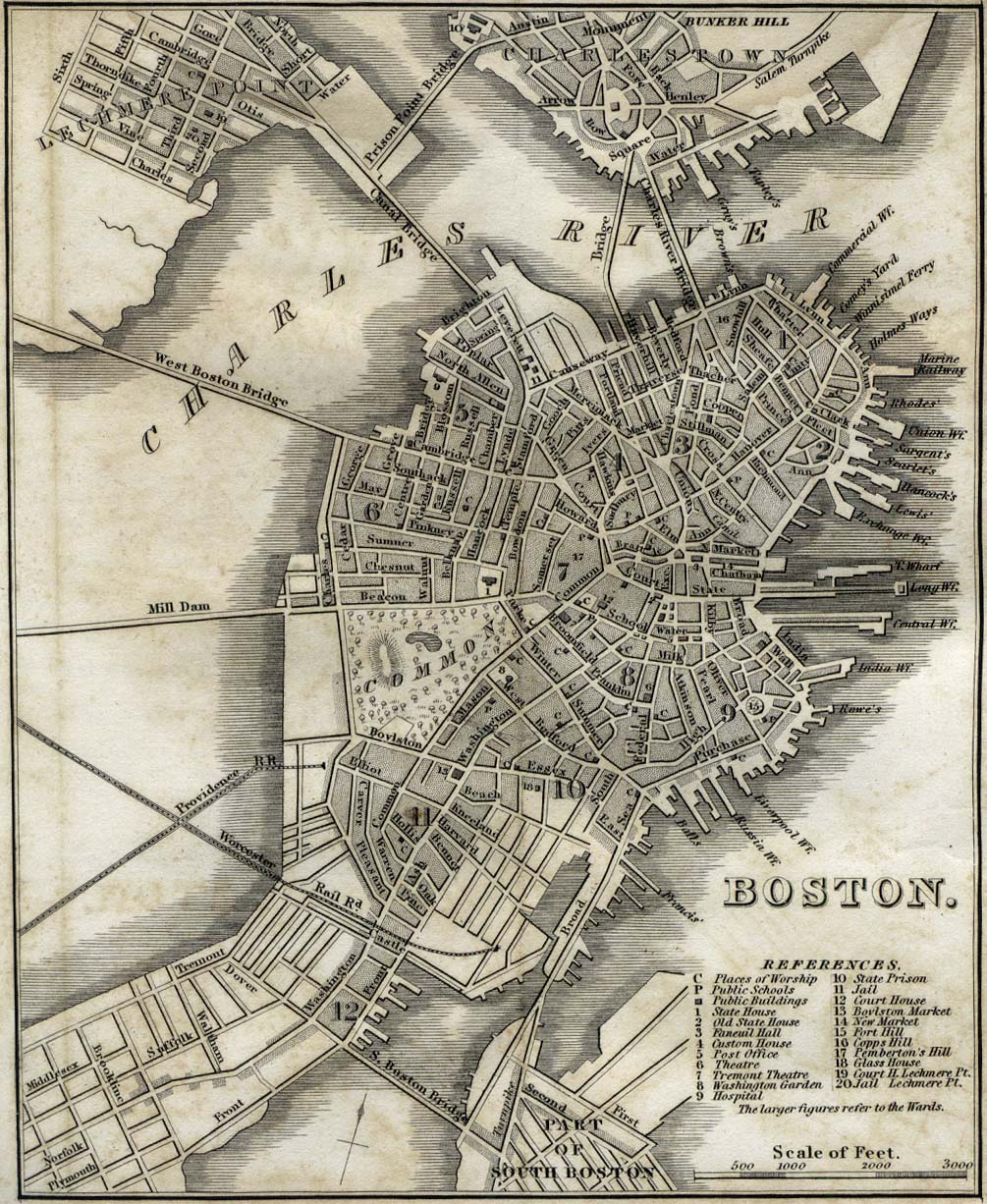
1842 map showing the location of Fort Hill (item 15, in the southeast of downtown)

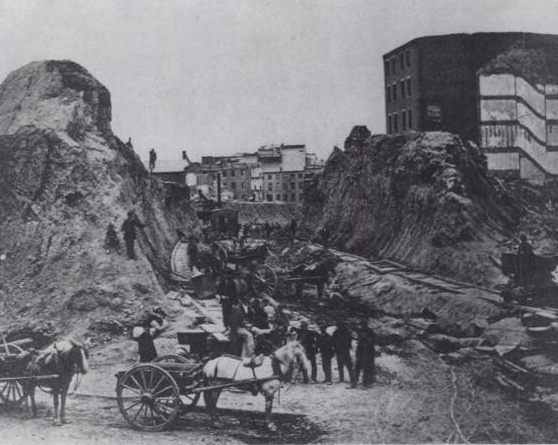
Removal of Fort Hill, Boston, 1869

Fort Point is a neighborhood or district of Boston, Massachusetts, and where a fort stood which guarded the city in colonial times. Much of the neighborhood is part of the Fort Point Channel Historic District.

== Boundaries ==
The boundaries of the modern neighborhood of Fort Point are somewhat ill-defined. At its broadest extent, it includes the land a few blocks on either side of the Fort Point Channel (which due to landfill is considerably smaller than it was in colonial times). The Fort Point artists' community is located on the opposite side of the channel. This is also called the South Boston Waterfront. Real estate listings include "Fort Point" locations east of the channel and west of the Boston Convention and Exhibition Center and the Boston World Trade Center. (Further south is South Boston proper.) The Boston Redevelopment Authority defines the Fort Point District within the neighborhood of South Boston as "an area of approximately 100 acres (0.40 km^{2}) defined by the Fort Point Channel to the west, Summer Street to the north, the Bypass Road to the east, and West 2nd Street to the south."

The Summer Street Bridge, which crosses the channel, has a sign which welcomes eastbound travelers to South Boston, and westbound travelers to Fort Point. The United States Postal Service Bulk Mail Center at Fort Point Station is located between the channel and South Station. To the northwest is Chinatown. The northeastern section of the Fort Point neighborhood, on the east side of the channel, could be said to overlap with the Financial District.

== History ==
Fort Hill was located near what is today the intersection of Oliver and High Streets. At least until 1675, (see map) the hill jutted out into the Atlantic Ocean, hence the designation of being a "point". Its height and proximity to the sea made the hill an advantageous point to put defensive cannons. Between 1866 and 1872, the City of Boston undertook a redevelopment project on Fort Hill in attempt to add more land for business facilities. The project called for the Hill to be leveled, for the streets to be widened, and for all buildings to be razed. Today the land is flat and largely occupied by the towers of International Place. Landfill has also extended the shoreline outward, so the location of the old fort is no longer directly on the waterfront.

The Fort Point neighborhood was featured in Martin Scorsese's 2006 film The Departed. An alley between Thompson Place and Farnsworth Street provided the setting for the fictional address "344 Wash." The dramatic views of downtown Boston from the rooftops of Fort Point were prominently featured in the film.

In 2001, the Fort Point District was petitioned as a Landmark District with the Boston Landmarks Commission. In 2007, a Mayoral-appointed Study Committee began drafting District guidelines. In December 2008, Mayor Menino and the Boston Landmarks Commission voted in favor of the guidelines which were officially approved on January 28, 2009 by the Boston City Council.

== Transportation ==
Fort Point is served by the Massachusetts Bay Transportation Authority via Broadway station and South Station as well as bus routes #7, #9, #11 and #47. The Silver Line (MBTA) bus rapid transit (BRT) system serves parts of Fort Point. Several water taxi companies serve Fort Point locations along Fort Point Channel such as Atlantic Wharf, Children's Wharf and the John Joseph Moakley United States Courthouse/Fan Pier connecting to Rowes Wharf and Logan International Airport.

With the rapid growth of Fort Point, private shuttles have supplemented public transportation to the neighborhood. The Southie Shuttle, Cultural Connector and Channel Center Shuttle are some of the private transportation services.

In 2013, plans were announced that diesel rail service would connect the South Boston Waterfront to Back Bay.

== Points of interest ==
- Grand Circle Gallery: 347 Congress Street
- 300 Summer Street Artist Building
- Artists for Humanity
- Art Basin: in Fort Point Channel
- Boston Children's Museum
- Design Innovation Gallery: 63 Melcher Street
- Fort Point Arts Community (FPAC) Gallery: 300 Summer Street
- Fort Point Pier
- FP3 Gallery: 346 Congress Street
- Hood Milk Bottle
- Institute of Contemporary Art, Boston
- Midway Studios Artist Building
- Midway Channel Gallery: 15 Channel Center Street
- Northern Avenue Bridge
- Walter Feldman Gallery: 15 Channel Center Street
