= Northern Avenue Bridge =

Bridge in Boston, Massachusetts, United States of America

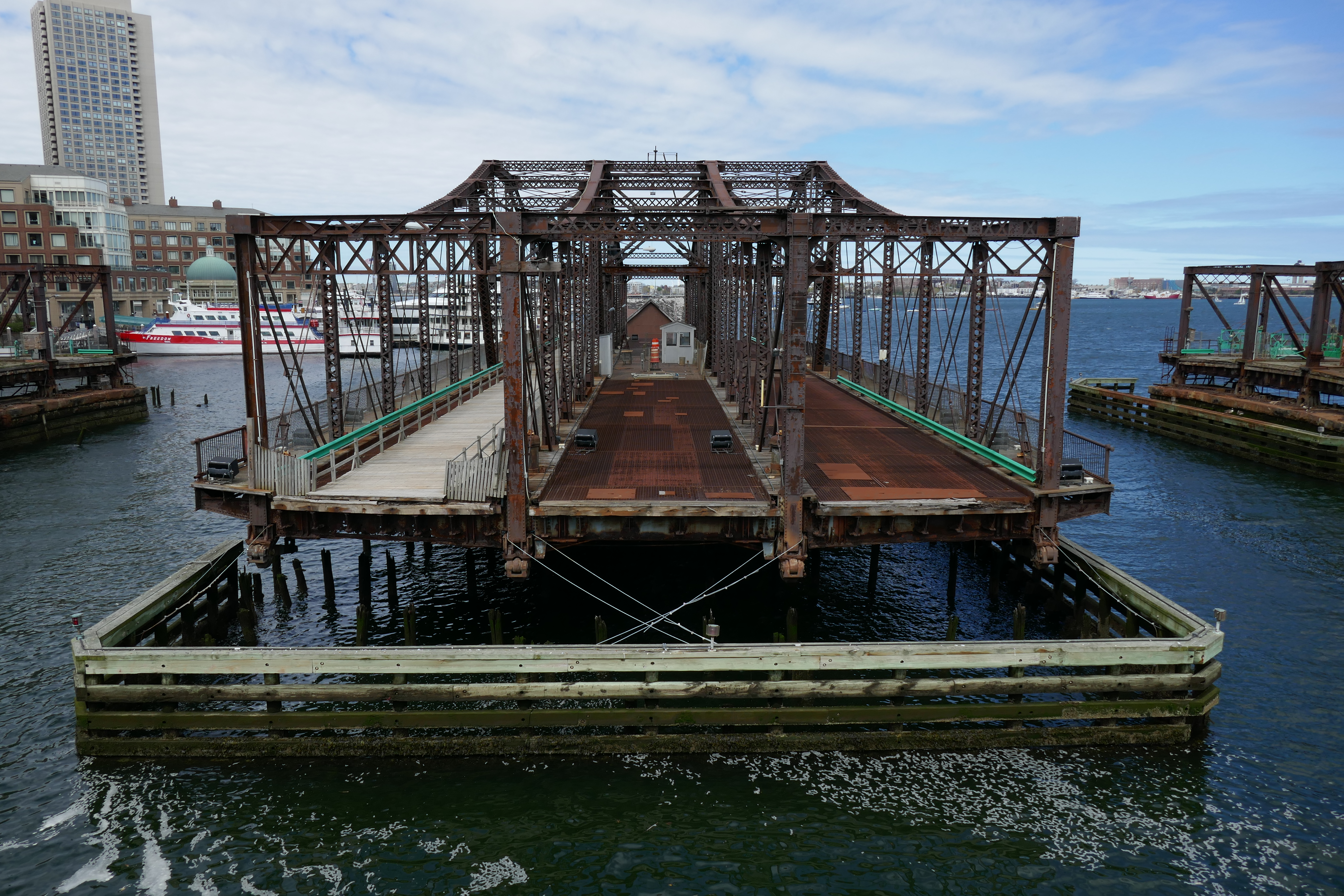
- The bridge in its open position in May 2016
- Coordinates: 42°21′16.3″N 71°2′58.0″W
- Carries: Northern Avenue
- Crosses: Fort Point Channel
- Locale: Boston, Massachusetts, U.S.
- Official name: Northern Avenue Swing Bridge
- Other name: Old Northern Avenue Bridge
- Owner: City of Boston
- Maintained by: Boston Public Works

Characteristics
- Design: Pratt truss swing span
- Material: Steel
- Total length: 643 feet (196 m)
- Width: 80 feet (24 m)
- Height: 46 feet (14 m) (above deck)
- Longest span: 283 feet (86 m) (swing span)
- Clearance below: 7 feet (2.1 m) (closed) unlimited (open)
- No. of lanes: 2

Rail characteristics
- No. of tracks: 1 (circa 1918–1970)

History
- Designer: William Jackson, City Engineer
- Engineering design by: Boston Public Works
- Constructed by: New England Structural Company (superstructure), W. H. Ellis Co. (piers & abutments)
- Built: 1905–1908
- Opened: October 24, 1908
- Closed: November 1997 (to vehicles); December 2014 (fully)
- Replaced by: Evelyn Moakley Bridge

Location
- Interactive map of Northern Avenue Bridge

The Northern Avenue Bridge is a swing bridge that spans the Fort Point Channel of Boston, Massachusetts. Following its closure as a road bridge in 1997, various redevelopment schemes have been proposed for the bridge, as well as outright demolition of the span.

In Historic American Engineering Record (HAER) documentation, the bridge is referred to as the Northern Avenue Swing Bridge. It is sometimes known as the Old Northern Avenue Bridge, as its replacement was briefly known as the New Northern Avenue Bridge before it was officially named the Evelyn Moakley Bridge.

== History ==
The swing bridge was constructed from 1905 to 1908, and opened to the public on October 24, 1908. Originally a steam engine and then later an electric compressed air system was used to rotate the center part of the span to allow water traffic to pass. Boston's city engineer, William Jackson, was the designer. Historic American Engineering Record (HAER) documentation notes that "Some of the operating machinery of the draw span for the Northern Avenue Bridge was identical to that of the Charlestown Bridge when originally constructed." The total length of the bridge is approximately 640 feet (200 m); the moveable center section is approximately 285 feet (87 m) long. The original approaches were dirt.

From 1912 to 1948, a firehouse constructed on piers abutted the bridge, serving Fireboat Engine Company 44 of the Boston Fire Department. Historical photos show that the firehouse and berth of the fireboat were located in the channel on the north side of the bridge, located east of the center span. The engine company relocated to the North End in October 1948, and the abandoned firehouse collapsed into the harbor in 1968. The bridge malfunctioned in March 1953 and hit some trash piled too high on a barge headed from Fort Hill Wharf to the dump at Spectacle Island.

The center span of the truss carried a single track for the Union Freight Railroad, although it was designed for two tracks.

The bridge was closed to vehicle traffic on November 8, 1997, shortly after the Evelyn Moakley Bridge was completed, but remained open as a pedestrian bridge. In December 2014, it was fully closed after inspectors found that 13 floor beams were unsafe for pedestrians.

In a letter dated October 26, 2015, the Coast Guard informed the City of Boston that the bridge was a "hazard to navigation", due to the risk of it falling into the Fort Point Channel, and requested removal of its most vulnerable portion.

=== Replacement plans ===
On January 20, 2016, Boston.com and The Boston Globe reported that the City of Boston would spend $100 million to reopen the bridge, as part of its agreement to bring General Electric's headquarters to the South Boston Waterfront. The following day, the Globe reported that the bridge would instead be removed, and possibly replaced. The Globe also reported that options to save the bridge ranged in cost from $26 million to over $70 million, per the City of Boston.

Later in the spring, the City of Boston and the Boston Society of Architects sponsored an "ideas competition" for reconstruction or replacement of the bridge.

In December 2019, city officials announced that the bridge would be rebuilt for use solely by pedestrians and bicyclists. Updated plans were announced in May 2020; design was expected to be finalized by the end of 2020 and construction to begin in 2021. However, the project was delayed due to the COVID-19 pandemic and the resignation of Mayor Marty Walsh.

=== Demolition plan ===
On November 4, 2024, the City of Boston submitted a Project Notification Form to the Massachusetts Historical Commission setting out its plan to demolish the bridge. The plan calls for the removal of the superstructure and the repair of the piers.

As of March 2025, Boston's public works department "is advancing plans to break it apart and load the pieces onto barges to a waterfront staging area... for disassembly and paint removal." The chief of the Boston Water and Sewer Commission has proposed a movable storm barrier for the site, which might receive federal funding and provide a foundation for a footbridge.

== Gallery ==
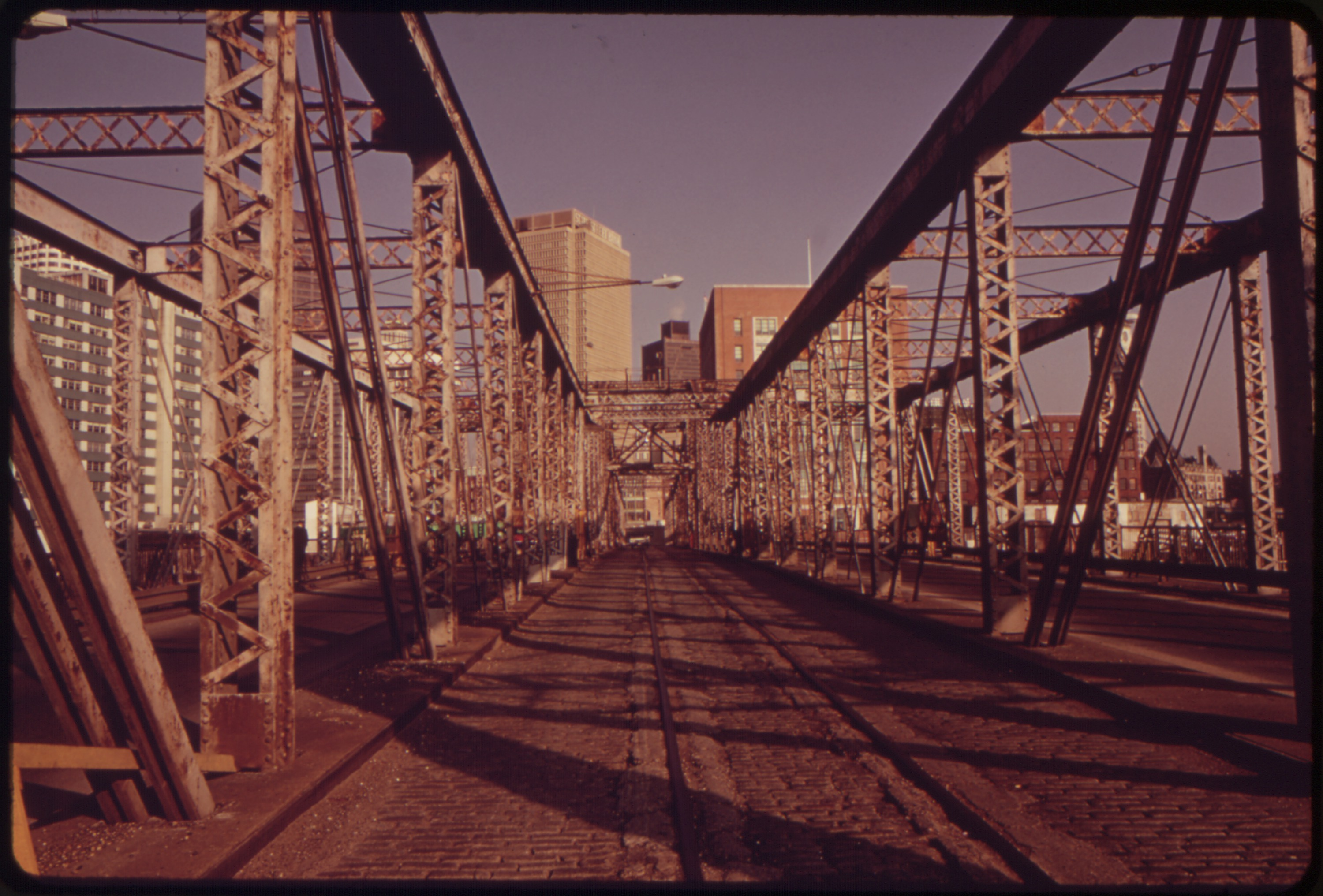
Center lane with railroad tracks visible

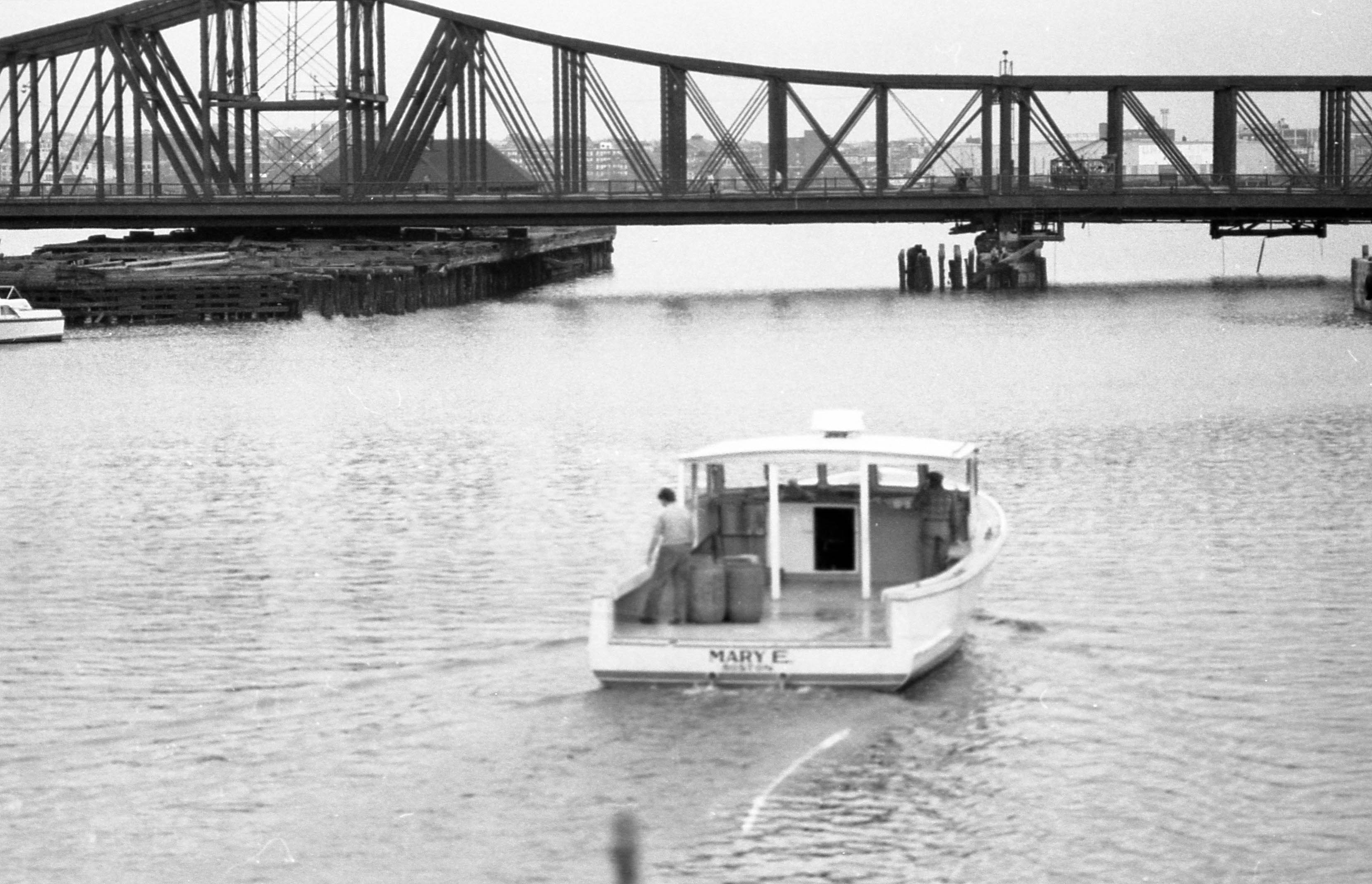
The bridge in the 1980s

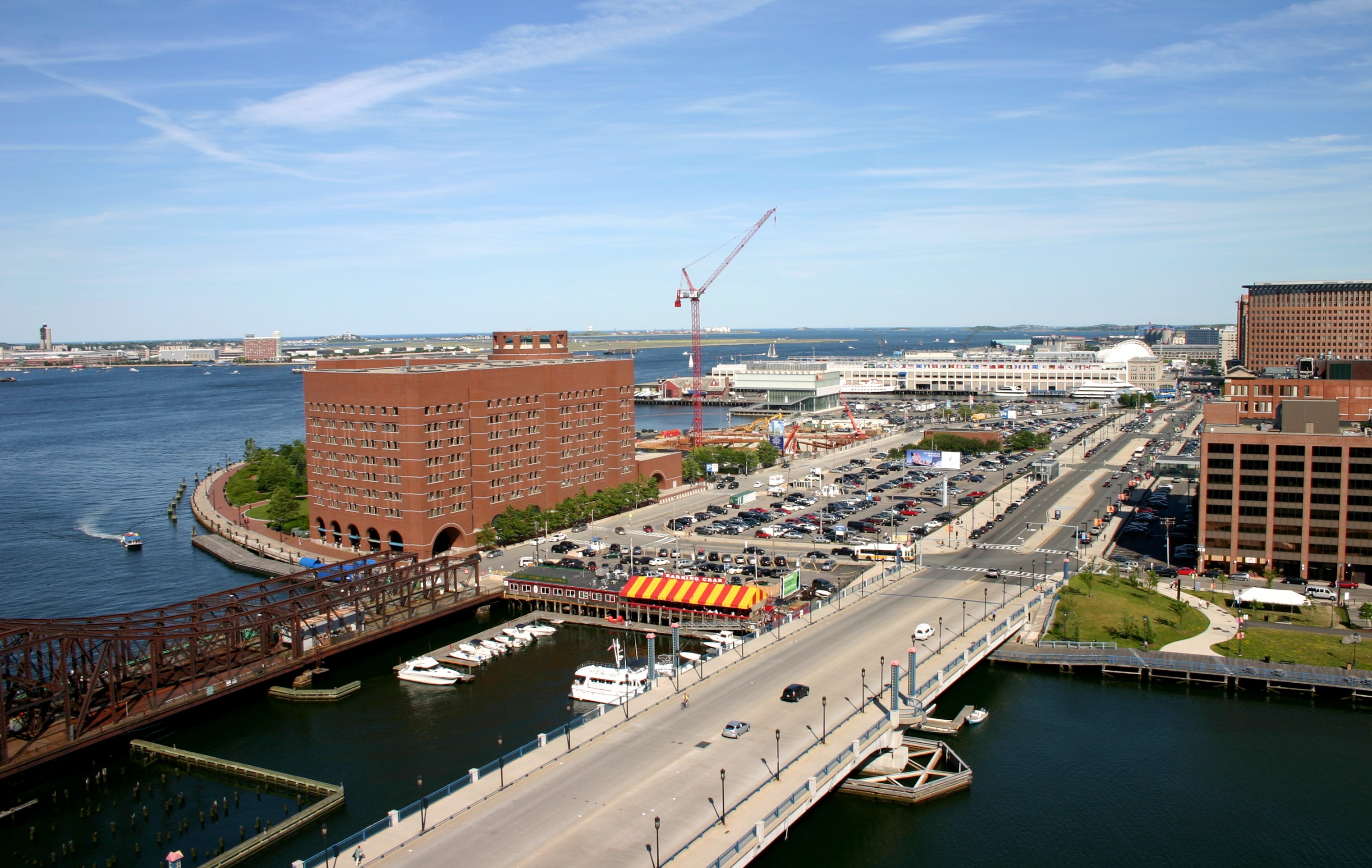
Partial view of Northern Avenue Bridge and Evelyn Moakley Bridge in 2008

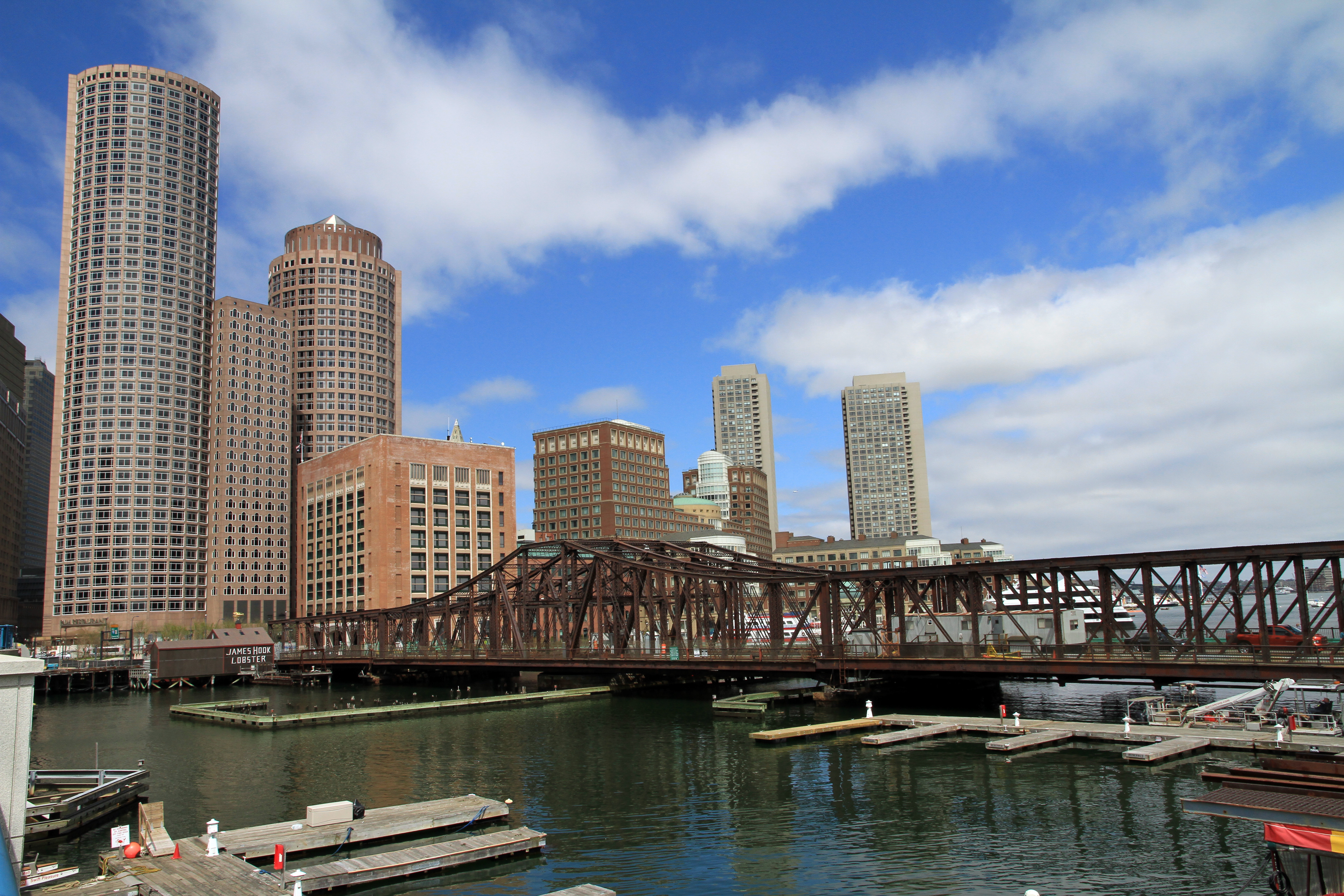
The bridge against the Boston skyline in 2013

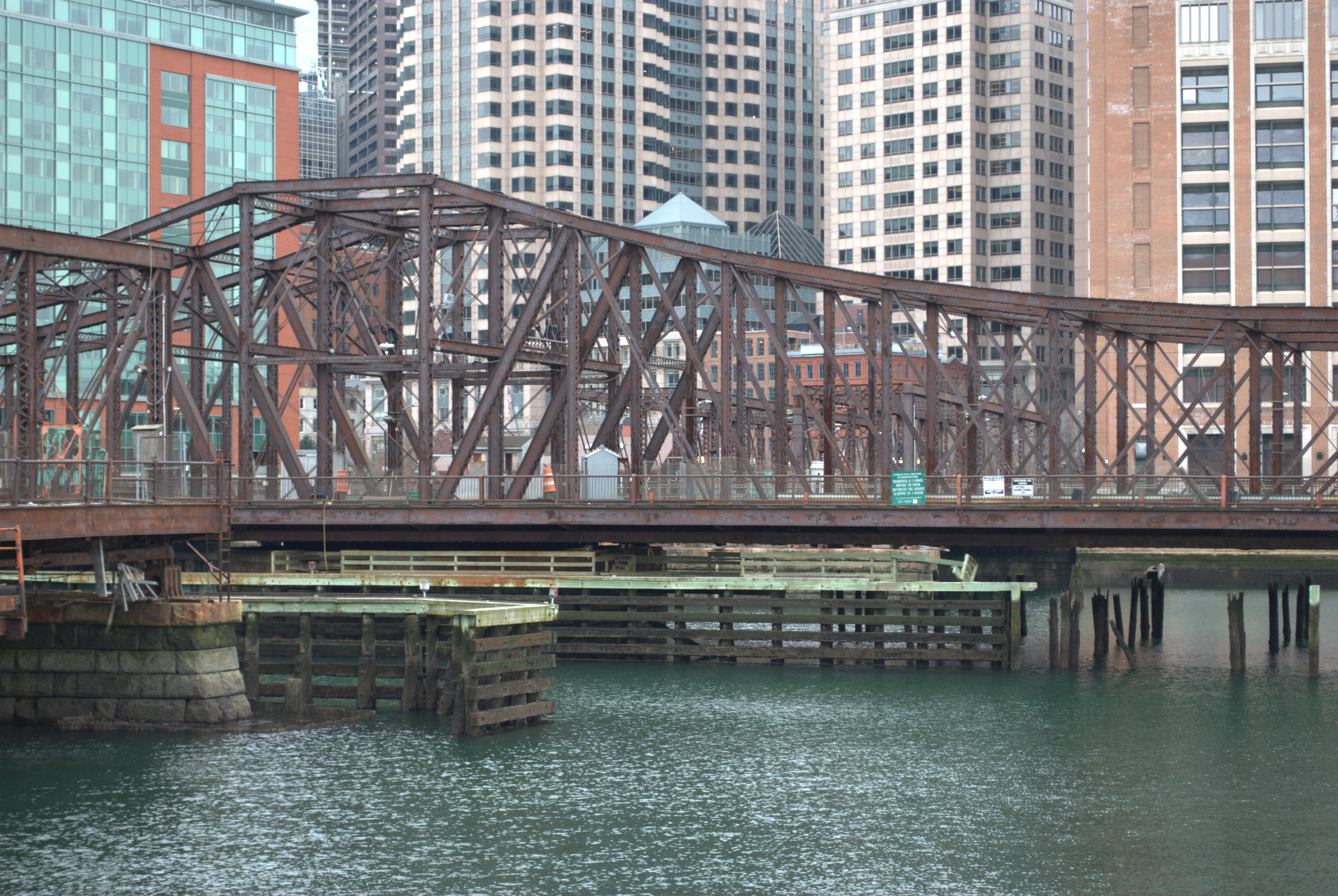
The bridge in December 2021

== See also ==
- List of bridges documented by the Historic American Engineering Record in Massachusetts
