= North End Bridge =

North End Bridge may refer to one of the following structures in the United States:

- North End Bridge, officially the Arthur J. McKenna Bridge, a crossing of the Connecticut River in West Springfield, Massachusetts
- North End Bridge, an alternate local name of the Bill Russell Bridge in Boston, Massachusetts
