= Evelyn Moakley Bridge =

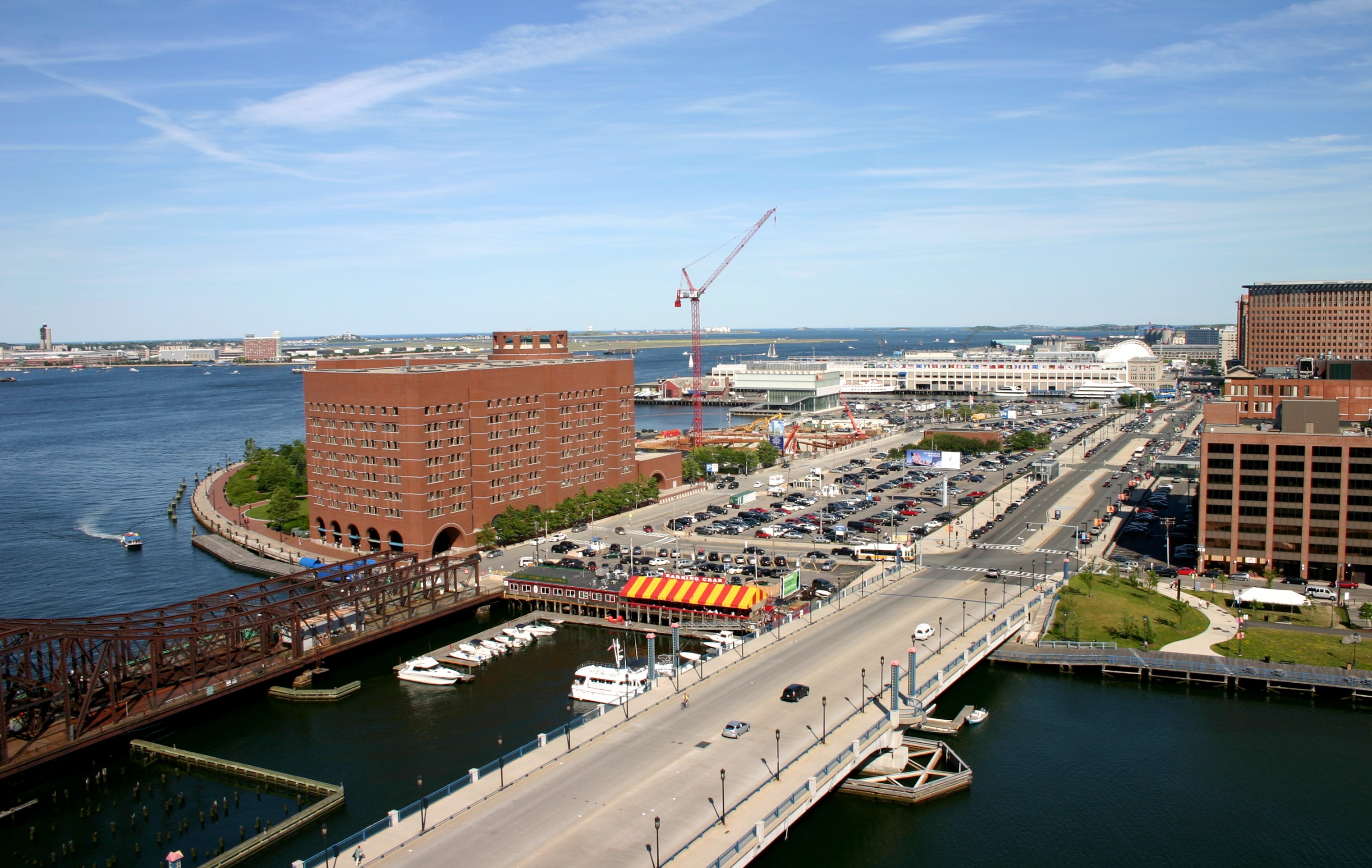
- Partial view of Evelyn Moakley Bridge (center) and Northern Avenue Bridge (left) in 2008
- Coordinates: 42°21′14.05″N 71°2′59.20″W
- Carries: Seaport Boulevard
- Crosses: Fort Point Channel
- Locale: Boston, Massachusetts, U.S.
- Other name(s): New Northern Avenue Bridge
- Named for: Evelyn Moakley

Characteristics
- Design: Haunched girder bridge
- Material: Prestressed concrete
- Total length: 191.17 metres (627.2 ft)
- Width: 29.53 metres (96.9 ft)
- No. of spans: 3
- Piers in water: 2
- No. of lanes: 4

History
- Built: December 1989 – 1996
- Opened: March 1996 (eastbound); October 1996 (two-way)
- Replaces: Northern Avenue Bridge

The Evelyn Moakley Bridge is a bridge that crosses Fort Point Channel in Boston, Massachusetts. It connects Downtown Boston to the Seaport District.

== History ==
Congressional approval for a new bridge to span Boston's Fort Point Channel was granted in late 1981. Such approval was necessary due to impact on a navigable waterway. Construction began in December 1989, and completion was initially scheduled for October 1992. Anthony's Pier 4, a popular Boston restaurant, was cited by The Boston Globe as "possibly the strongest single force behind the project." (Note: Anthony's Pier 4 closed in 2013 and the building was demolished in 2016–17.)

The bridge was initially known as the New Northern Avenue Bridge, due to its location adjacent to the "old" Northern Avenue Bridge, which also provided vehicle access across the Fort Point Channel and had opened in 1908. (Note: The Northern Avenue Bridge also provided rail access, which was in use circa 1918–1970.) The new bridge was constructed parallel to and about 250 feet (76 m) (Note: As measured center to center.) south of the old bridge. While the old structure had been built as a swing bridge, the new structure was constructed as a fixed span.

The bridge opened to eastbound traffic by early March 1996, and opened to two-way traffic in October 1996.

On October 4, 1996, the bridge was formally named for the wife of Congressman Joe Moakley, following her death from cancer, and after Moakley declined an offer to have the bridge named in his honor.

At the eastern end of the bridge is the John Joseph Moakley Federal Courthouse (completed in 1999) and the Seaport Shrine (completed in 2017).
