= William Jackson (engineer) =

Boston, Massachusetts city engineer

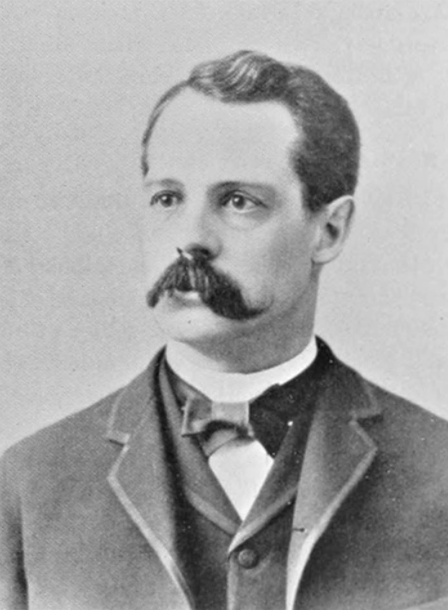
- Born: March 13, 1848; Brighton, Massachusetts, U.S.
- Died: June 30, 1910 (aged 62); Brighton, Massachusetts, U.S.
- Resting place: Evergreen Cemetery, Boston, Massachusetts, U.S.
- Education: Massachusetts Institute of Technology
- Occupation: Civil engineer
- Employer: City of Boston
- Spouse: Mary Stuart MacCorry (m. 1886; died 1905)
- Children: 1
- Parent(s): Samuel and Mary Wright (Field) Jackson

William Jackson (March 13, 1848 – June 30, 1910) an American civil engineer. He served as the city engineer of Boston, Massachusetts, from 1885 to 1910 and was responsible for a number of major bridges in the city, including the Harvard Bridge, Longfellow Bridge, and Charlestown Bridge.

== Biography ==
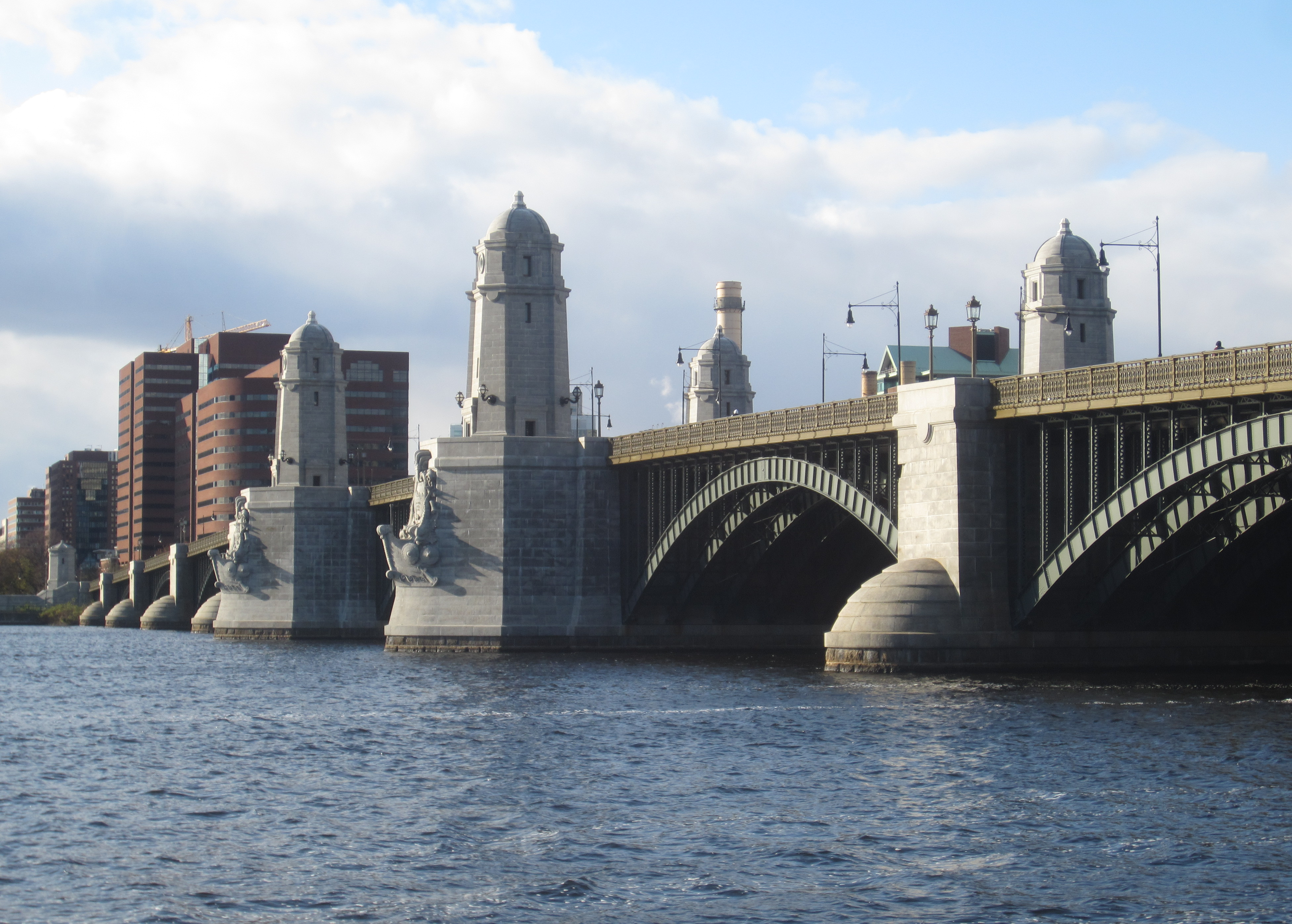
Longfellow Bridge, originally known as the Cambridge Bridge

Jackson was born in Brighton, Massachusetts, to Samuel and Mary Wright (Field) Jackson. He was educated at the public schools of Brighton and the Massachusetts Institute of Technology, where he took the full course with the Class of 1868 but left without degree on May 4, 1868, when he received employment on the staff of the City Engineer of Boston. His first work was on the construction of the Chestnut Hill Reservoir of the Boston Water-Works. In 1870, he became Engineer for the Town of Brighton, and also engaged in private practice until Brighton was annexed to Boston in 1873, when he again entered the office of the Boston City Engineer. During the next three years, he was engaged on various works, including surveys for the introduction of water into Brighton and West Roxbury. From 1876 to 1885, he was Assistant Engineer on the Boston Main Drainage Works, an important and difficult engineering undertaking.

In April 1885, upon his predecessor's death, Jackson was appointed City Engineer, which position he occupied continuously until his death. In addition to his civic duties he was engaged in other important engineering works at various times. From 1887 to 1891, he was Chief Engineer for the Harvard Bridge Commissioners; from 1896 to 1900, Chief Engineer of Charlestown Bridge; and from 1898 until his death, Chief Engineer for the Cambridge Bridge Commission. In 1891 and 1892, he was a member of the Boston Rapid Transit Commission; and a member of the Boston Statistics Commission from 1898 until his death. From 1902 to 1904, he was a member of the special commission on the abolition of grade crossings in Attleboro, Massachusetts, and at his death had been for three years a member of commissions on the abolition of grade crossings in Foxboro, Westwood, Canton, Sharon, and Mansfield, Massachusetts. He was Consulting Engineer to the Cambridge Water Board on the construction of the Hobbs Brook Conduit, in 1904; to the Shore Road Commission, in Brooklyn, New York, in 1896 and 1897; and to the Massachusetts Harbor and Land Commission on the Commonwealth Dock, South Boston, in 1899. He was also a member of the Approving Board appointed by the Legislature in 1907 to pass upon plans for the development and extension of Boston's drainage systems.

Jackson was elected a member of the American Society of Civil Engineers in 1884, and served on its board of directors from 1902 to 1904. He was also a member of the following organizations: Union, Art, and Technology Clubs, of Boston; Boston City Club, Point Shirley Club, Boston Driving Club, Strollers' Club of New York, Allston Golf Club, Commonwealth Riding Club, the Masonic Fraternity, Boston Chamber of Commerce, Technology Alumni Association, Society of Arts, American Association for the Advancement of Science, National Geographical Society, Bibliophile Society, National Municipal League, American Civic Alliance, American Civic Association, New England Historical and Genealogical Society, Society of Colonial Wars, and The Bostonian Society. He was also a member of the Boston Society of Civil Engineers, and of the New England Water Works Association.

He married Mary Stuart MacCorry on April 27, 1886, and they had one child.

He died from appendicitis at his home in Brighton on June 30, 1910.

== Notable works ==
- Charlestown Bridge
- Harvard Bridge
- Longfellow Bridge
- Northern Avenue Bridge
