= Artists for Humanity =

Non-profit organization in the US

- Formation: 1992; 33 years ago
- Type: Nonprofit
- Purpose: Arts and culture
- Headquarters: South Boston
- Website: http://www.afhboston.org/

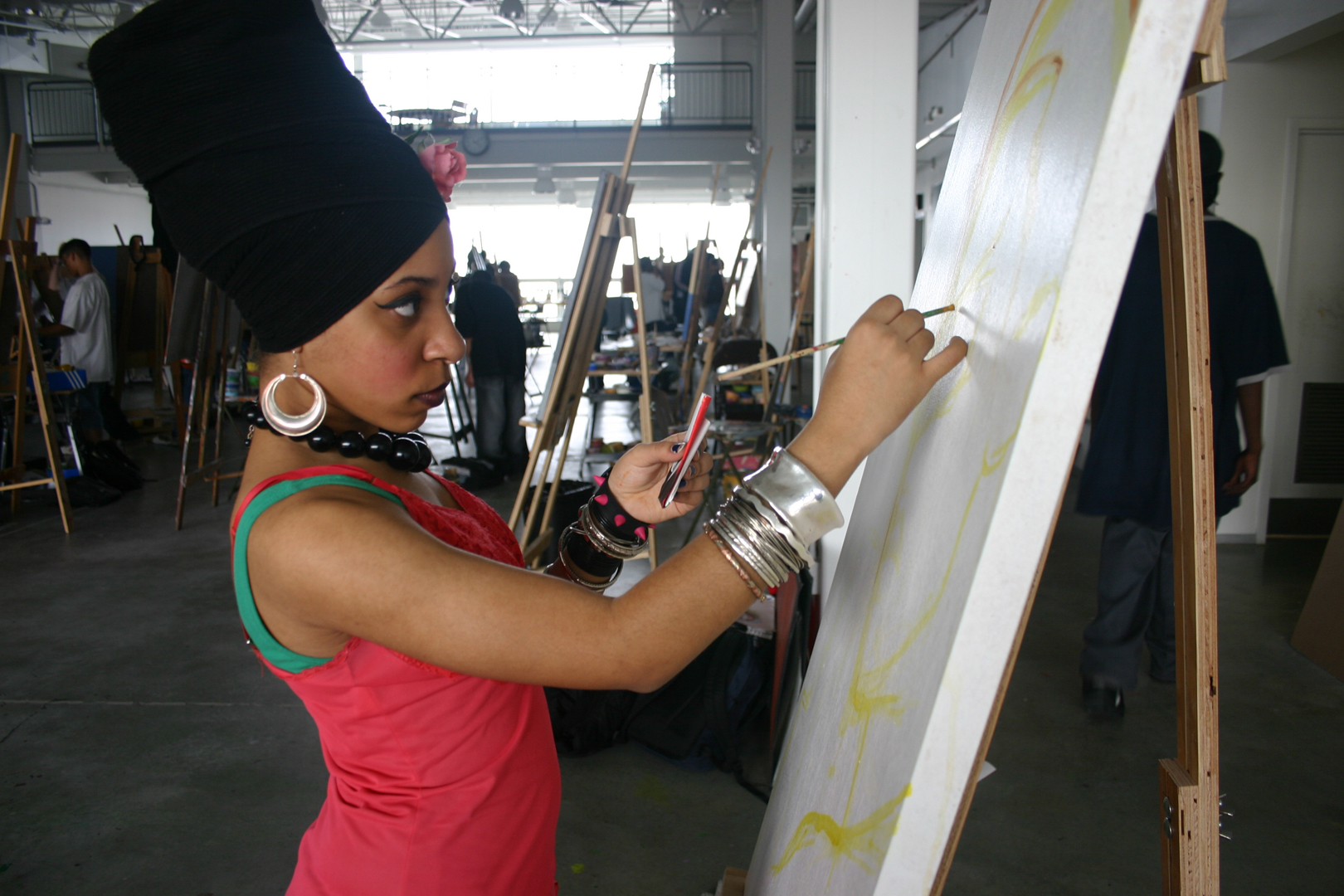

Artists For Humanity (AFH) is a non-profit youth arts and enterprise organization based at 100 West Second Street in South Boston, Massachusetts, United States. The organizations provides inner-city youth with keys to self-sufficiency through paid employment in the arts. It operates on the belief that exposure to the arts can be a productive and life-changing opportunity for young people. Bridging economic, racial, and social divisions, AFH works to restore urban neighborhoods by introducing young people’s creativity to the business community.

== History ==
The organization was originally founded in 1992, as an after school program. Students participating in the program enrolled in paid apprenticeships where they produced art marketed towards the city's business community.

== The Youth-Run Arts Micro-Enterprise ==
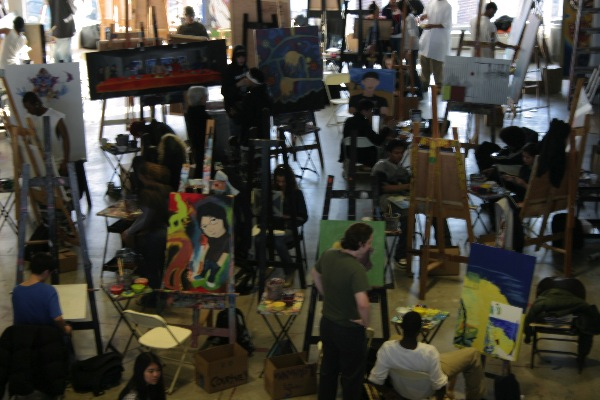

AFH’s central program, the Youth-Run Arts Micro-Enterprise, is a year-round apprenticeship and leadership program that employs inner-city teens during out-of-school time. AFH partners small groups of youth with professional artists/designers and young artist mentors to design, create and sell art products. With staffed studios in five artistic media – painting/murals, sculpture/industrial design, silk-screen, graphic design and photography/web design, youth and mentors collaborate on creative projects, many commissioned by clients. In the process, young artists develop entrepreneurial skills, as they are encouraged to participate in outreach and marketing of projects.

== The Artists For Humanity EpiCenter ==
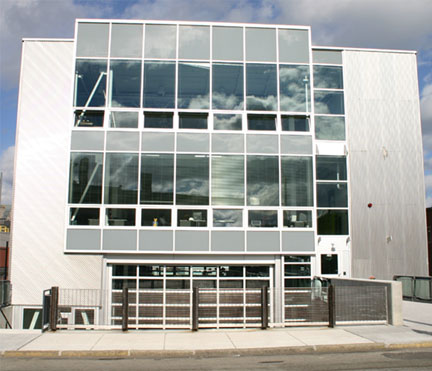

In September 2004, Artists For Humanity completed EpiCenter, a 23,500 square foot center that houses art programs and gallery space in Boston's Fort Point artist district. It is a 100% renewable energy building. In October 2005, the United States Green Building Council awarded the Artists For Humanity EpiCenter a LEED Platinum certification – the highest honor for sustainable architecture. In 2007 the EpiCenter was awarded the Rudy Bruner Award for Urban Excellence silver medal.

In 2018, the center was expanded to 53,500 square feet.
