= Seaport, Boston =

Neighborhood in Boston, Massachusetts

Coordinates: 42.346°N 71.042°W

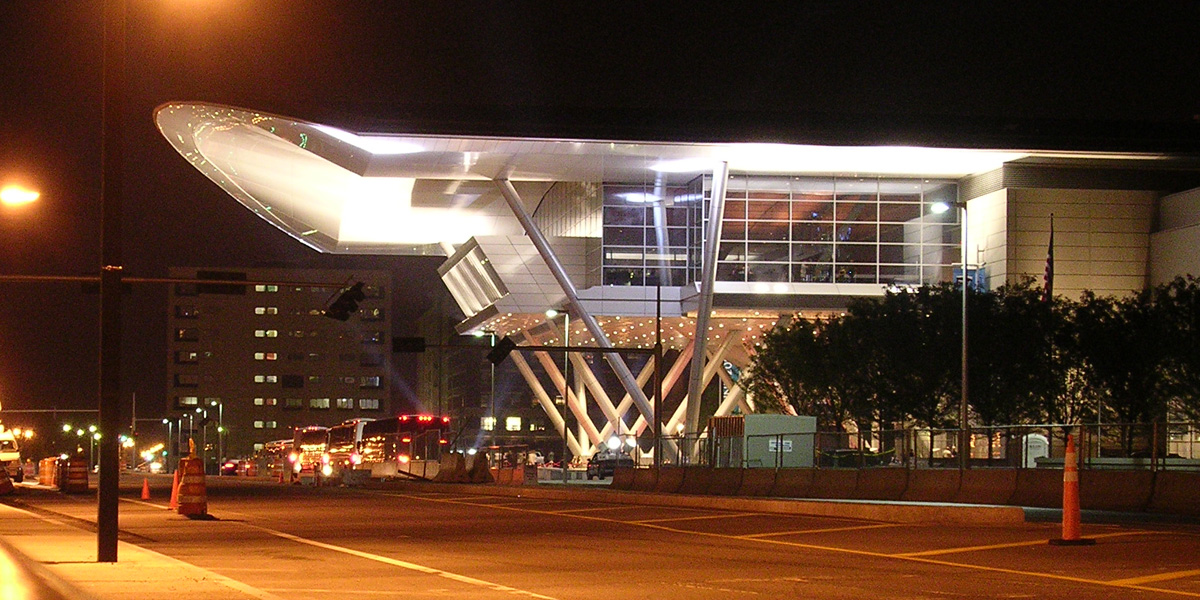
Boston Convention and Exhibition Center

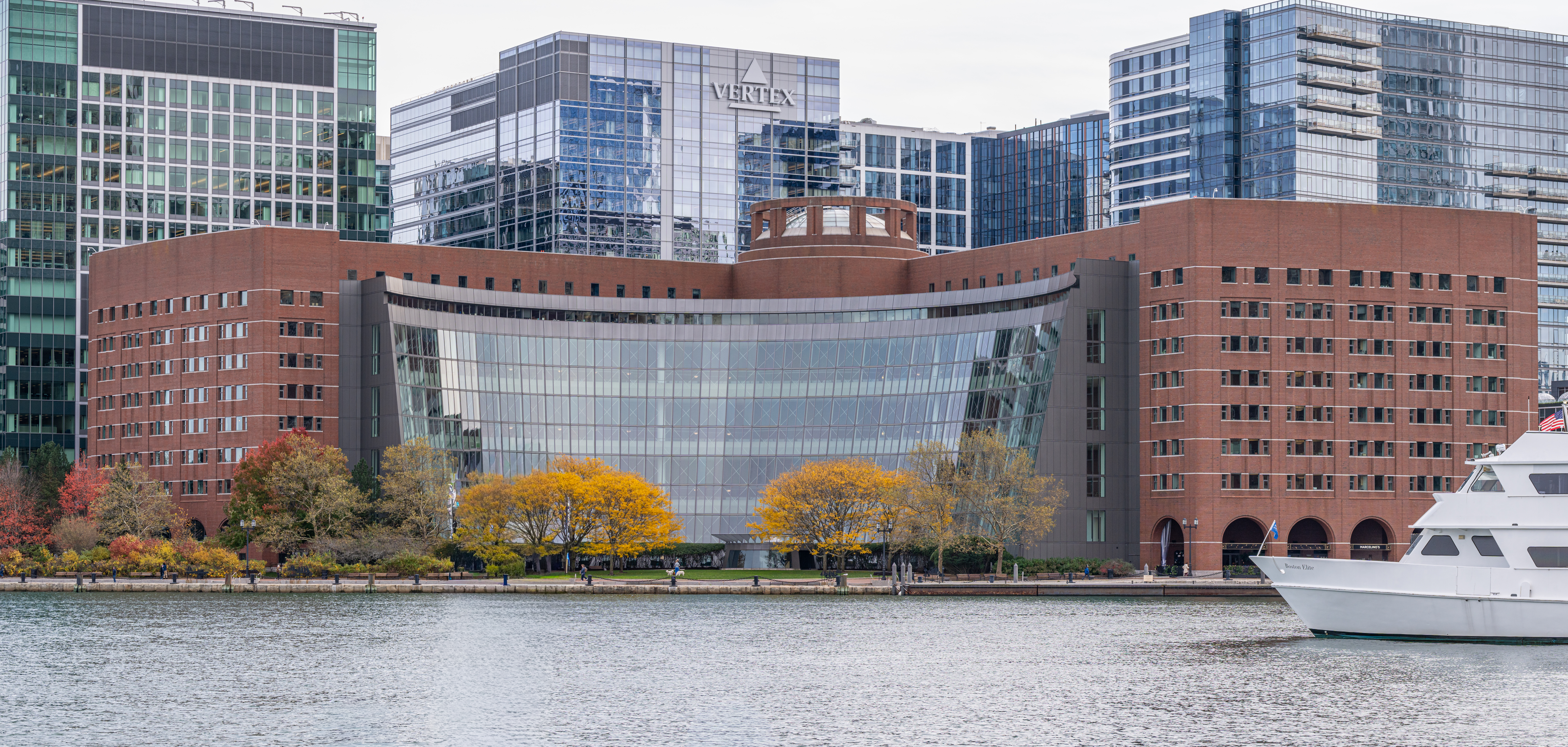
John Joseph Moakley United States Courthouse on Fan Pier

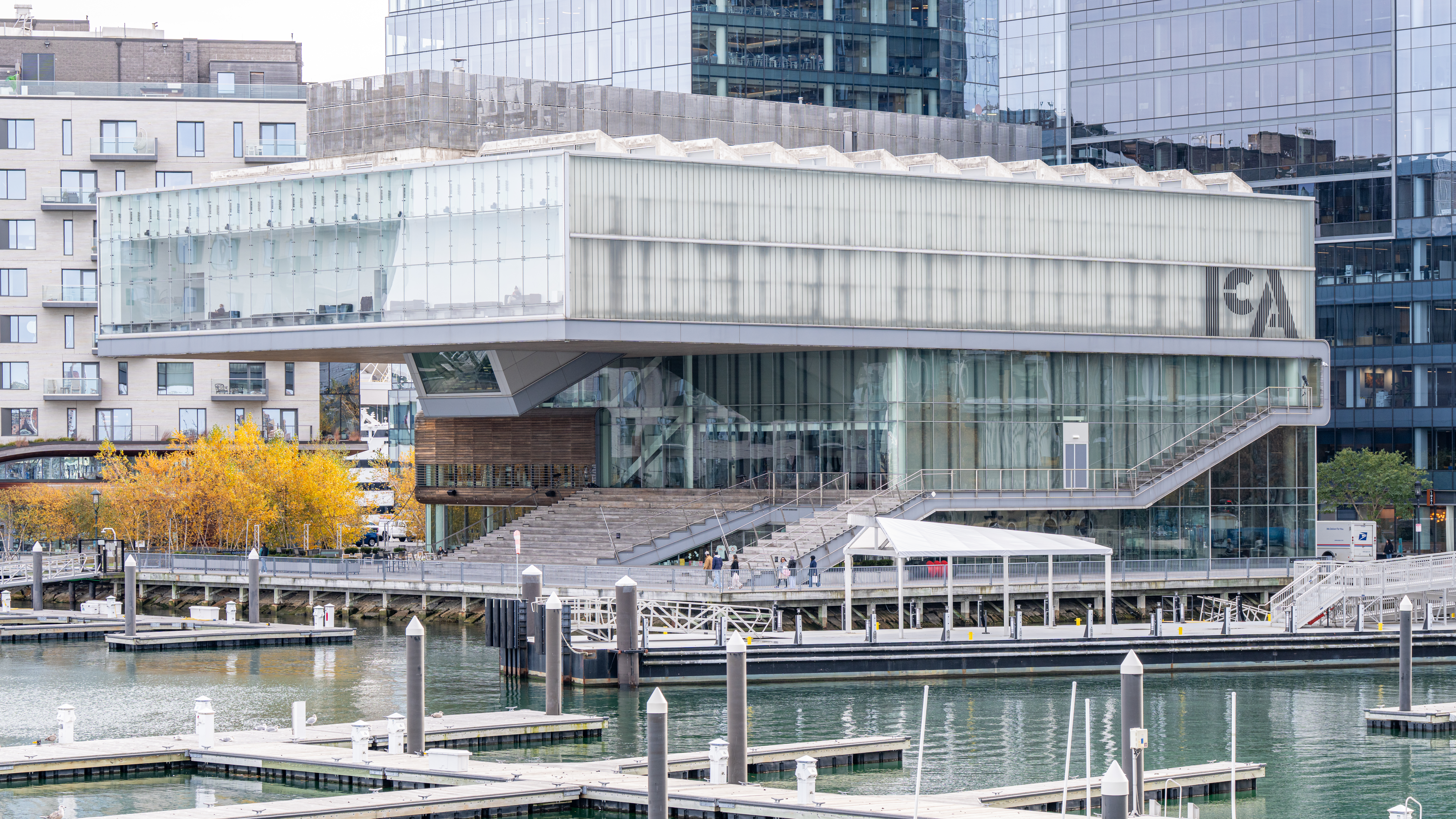
Institute of Contemporary Art

The Seaport (officially the South Boston Waterfront) is a neighborhood in Boston, Massachusetts. It is part of the larger neighborhood of South Boston, and is also sometimes called the Innovation District. The Seaport is a formerly industrial area that has undergone an extensive redevelopment effort in recent years. It is bordered by the Fort Point Channel to the west, Boston Harbor to the north and east, and the historic residential neighborhood of South Boston to the south.

== Name ==
The section of South Boston north of First Street was targeted for massive redevelopment by the administration of Mayor Thomas Menino and the Boston Planning and Development Agency. Initially referred to as the Seaport District by the BRA, the area was officially restyled the "South Boston Waterfront" after virulent protest from natives and local politicians, including City Council president James M. Kelly. Despite this, it is commonly known as the Seaport District. The name Innovation District was also proposed.

== Development ==
Development in the Seaport has boomed during the early 21st century. It was considered "the hottest, fastest-growing real estate market in the country" in 2014. As of 2017, it was the fastest growing part of Boston and has stimulated significant economic growth in the city.

The restoration of the Seaport began with the completion of the Big Dig in the early 2000s. This $14.6 billion project buried the formerly elevated Central Artery I-93 Interstate which previously cut off the waterfront from the rest of the city. Additionally, Interstate 90 was extended eastward from I-93 through the Seaport and across Boston Harbor in the Ted Williams Tunnel to Logan International Airport and East Boston to connect the SPID with downtown Boston, revitalizing the area and prompting a surge of growth.

The Waterfront segment of the Silver Line of the MBTA, constructed in concert with the highway undergrounding, opened in December 2004. It consists of a subway under the Seaport that connects downtown at South Station, surface connections to the Boston Design Center, and buses running in the new highway harbor tunnel to the airport. The Boston Harborwalk runs along the north side of the district. The Evelyn Moakley Bridge connects the Seaport to Downtown Boston.

In May 2010, Menino announced plans for the city to develop 1,000 acres on the South Boston Waterfront as an Innovation District. Inspired by the success of the 22@ model, the mayor's vision was to redevelop the then-mostly abandoned Seaport District into a hub for Information Age jobs and a new frontier for cutting-edge industries such as clean tech, health care information technology and mobile media. It is now home to tens of new office towers, residential buildings, and "innovation labs" either proposed or under construction. The buildings are designed with critical systems above the first floor to avoid flooding from the tides.

Between Menino's announcement of an innovation district in 2010 and 2017, 5,000 new jobs were created and over 200 new companies have formed. Forty percent of the companies located in the Innovation District share space in co-working spaces and incubators. Over 1,100 housing units were constructed, including 300 innovation micro-units.

=== Commercial ===
As of 2017, the Seaport has 78 restaurants, 8 hotels, and continues to grow. The South Boston Waterfront area is part of the Port of Boston on Boston Harbor.

In September 2010, the Seaport Square project was under planning. It was expected to cost $3 billion and replace parking lots between the federal courthouse and convention center with a 6,300,000-square-foot (590,000 m^{2}) mixed-use development. Construction was expected to begin in 2011.

In 2007, the Fallon Company was developing Boston's Fan Pier, one of the most sought-after waterfront sites in the United States, and a catalyst for the revitalization of South Boston's waterfront. Fan Pier is a nine-acre, 21 city block site which consisted largely of underutilized parking lots when the Fallon Company purchased it for $115 million in 2005. As of 2015, it was a neighborhood consisting of four commercial towers-–One Marina Park Drive, 11 Fan Pier Boulevard, 50 Northern Avenue, and 100 Northern Avenue—and a luxury condominium tower Twenty Two Liberty. A second residential building, Fifty Liberty, was under construction at that time and two more high-rise towers were planned. When complete in 2020, the $4 billion Fan Pier project will encompass three million square feet of commercial and residential real estate, public, civic and cultural space, including two parks and a 6-acre marina.

On January 13, 2016, it was announced that GE would be moving its corporate headquarters from Fairfield, Connecticut, to the South Boston Waterfront. Some of the workers were planned to arrive in the summer of 2016 and the full move to be completed by 2018. GE ranks eighth on the Fortune 500 at the time and was to become the largest publicly traded company based in Massachusetts. Subsequently, the company announced plans to shrink and eventually sold their property on Fort Point Channel for $287 million.

In November 2016, the global athletic footwear and apparel company Reebok announced they would be moving their headquarters from the Boston suburb of Canton to the Innovation and Design Building in the Seaport District of South Boston. The reasons for the move, according to the company, is to be located in an urban environment that is more desirable to millennial workers and to "clarify the roles" of United States offices. The move was completed in the fall of 2018.

Soaring rent prices in the Seaport have raised concerns that the rapid real estate development in the area is pricing out entrepreneurs and startup companies – the organizations and people the Innovation District is designed to attract. In just a few years, rents have increased 43% in the Seaport, with the average rent at $52.92 per square foot, approximately at the same level of Boston's affluent Back Bay neighborhood.

=== Residential ===
Due to the increase in nightlife in the neighborhood, on-street parking for residents has become increasingly scarce. In response, city officials launched a 90-day pilot program that will expand resident only parking to seven days a week, from four. The aim, according to City Council President Bill Linehan was to address the scarcity of parking for residents on weekends.

According to The Boston Globe, a two-bedroom apartment in the Seaport area can rent for more than $5,000 per month and the purchase cost would be more than $2 million in 2018.

=== Institutions ===
The Boston Convention and Exhibition Center straddles D Street. The convention center was built in 2004. The Seaport Hotel and Seaport World Trade Center is located on Commonwealth Pier. A new home for the Institute of Contemporary Art hangs over Boston Harbor just north of Northern Avenue.

The Society of Arts and Crafts, New England's oldest craft-focused nonprofit is situated closeby on Pier 4. The John Joseph Moakley United States Courthouse is on Fan Pier.

The Seaport Shrine is right over the Moakley Bridge on Seaport Boulevard.

== Climate-related flood risks ==
The Seaport District is at risk of climate-related flooding over the next 30 years. A 2021 report by the First Street Foundation found that all critical infrastructure, nearly all commercial buildings, and 90% of roads in the Seaport District are at risk of becoming inoperable by mid-century due to climate-related flooding.
