= Fort Point Channel =

Channel in Boston, Massachusetts, US

Coordinates: 42.3499°N 71.0527°W

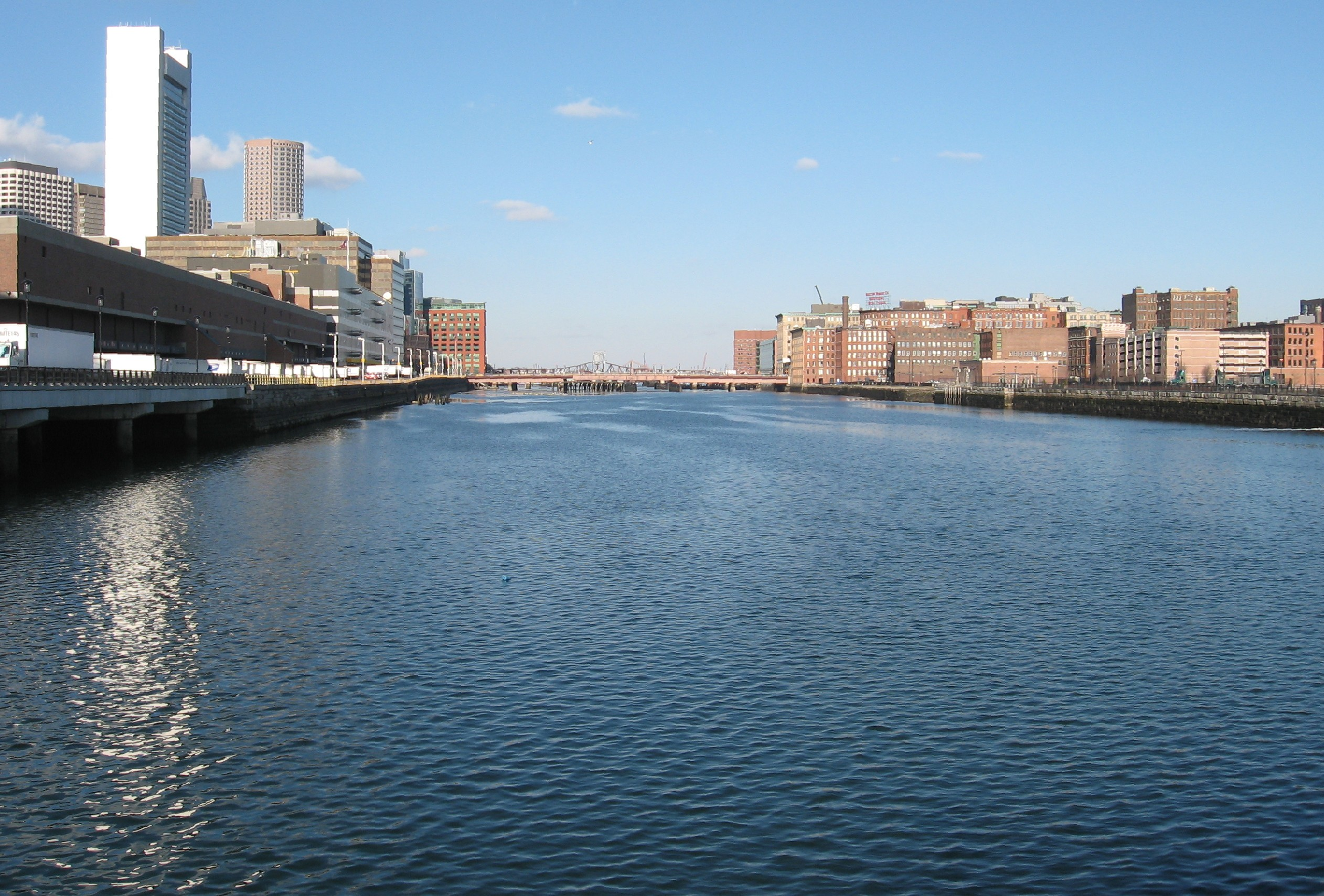
Fort Point Channel, as seen from the south end looking north.

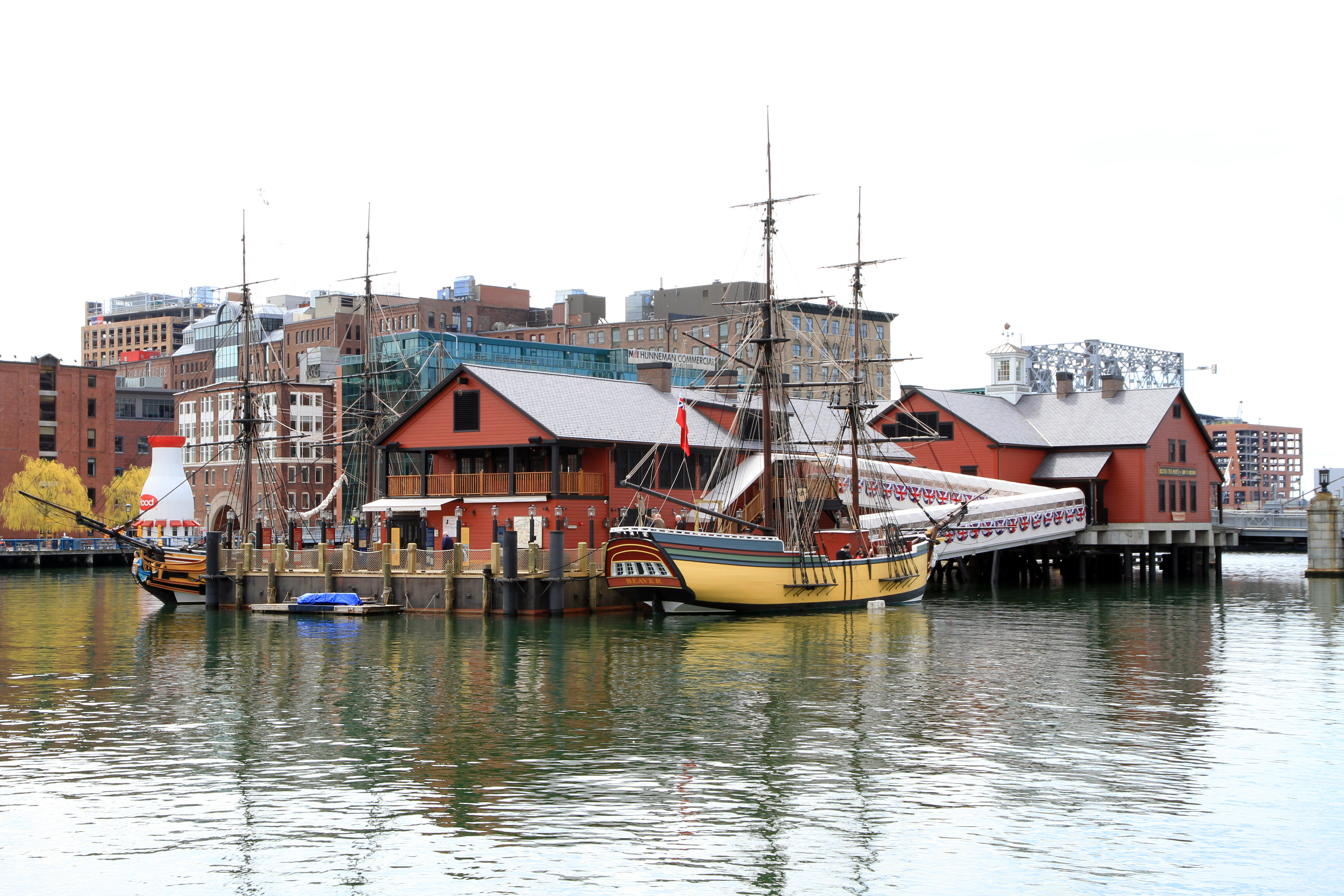
Fort Point Channel

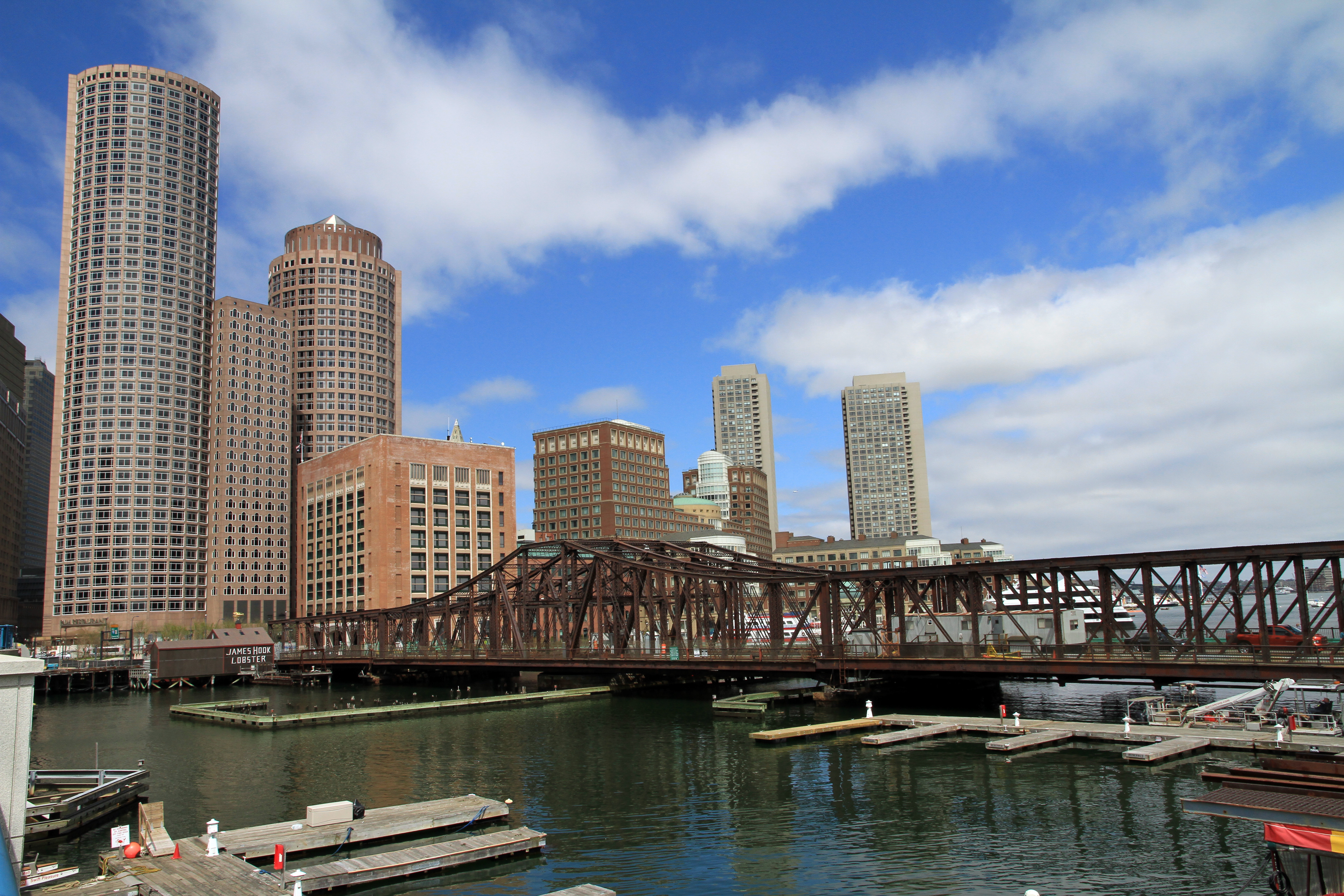
Old Northern Avenue Bridge

Fort Point Channel is a maritime channel adjacent to Boston, Massachusetts. The channel separates South Boston from Downtown Boston and feeds into Boston Harbor. The channel is surrounded by the Fort Point neighborhood, which is also named after the same colonial-era fort.

== History ==
The south part of Fort Point Channel has been gradually filled in for use by the South Bay rail yard and several highways (specifically the Central Artery and the Southeast Expressway). At its south end, the channel once widened into South Bay, from which the Roxbury Canal continued southwest where the Massachusetts Avenue Connector is now. The Boston Tea Party occurred at its northern end.

The banks of the channel are still busy with activity. South of Summer Street on the west side of the channel is a large United States Postal Service facility. A large parcel, home to Gillette, lies at the southeast corner of the channel. The back of the Federal Reserve Bank of Boston building looks over the channel, and another federal building, the John Joseph Moakley United States Courthouse, lies on Fan Pier at the mouth of the channel. One of Boston's odder attractions, the Hood Milk Bottle, lies on the banks as well, next to Boston Children's Museum. During the 1980s, a nightclub and popular concert venue called The Channel was located on the South Boston bank.

On October 21, 2011, Fort Point Pier opened for public use south of the Summer Street Bridge. To prepare for construction, a fifty-foot (15 m) section of the Fort Point Channel seawall south of Necco Court was restored by P&G Gillette. Public access has made Fort Point Channel popular for kayaking and standup paddle boarding.

The chief engineer of the Boston Water and Sewer Commission has proposed a stormwater barrier as part of the replacement for the now-closed Northern Avenue Bridge. Fort Point Channel drains a large portion of Downtown Boston, South Boston, and Dorchester.

== Crossings ==
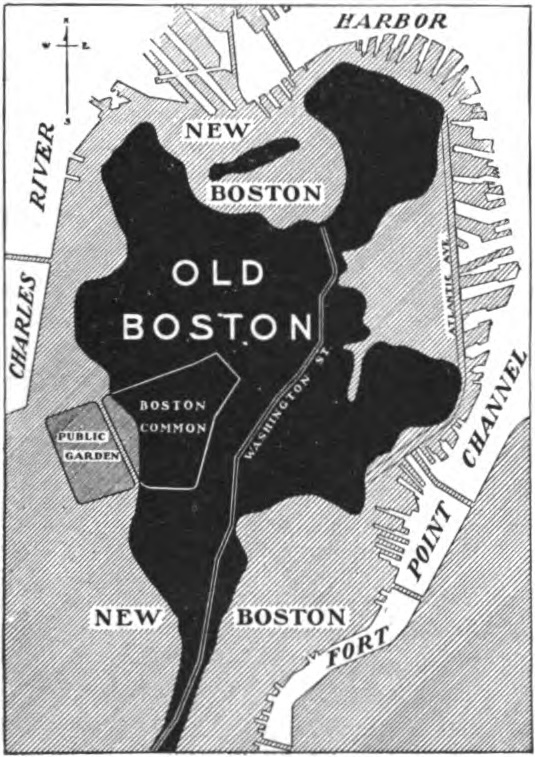
Fort Point as it relates to how Boston was filled in.

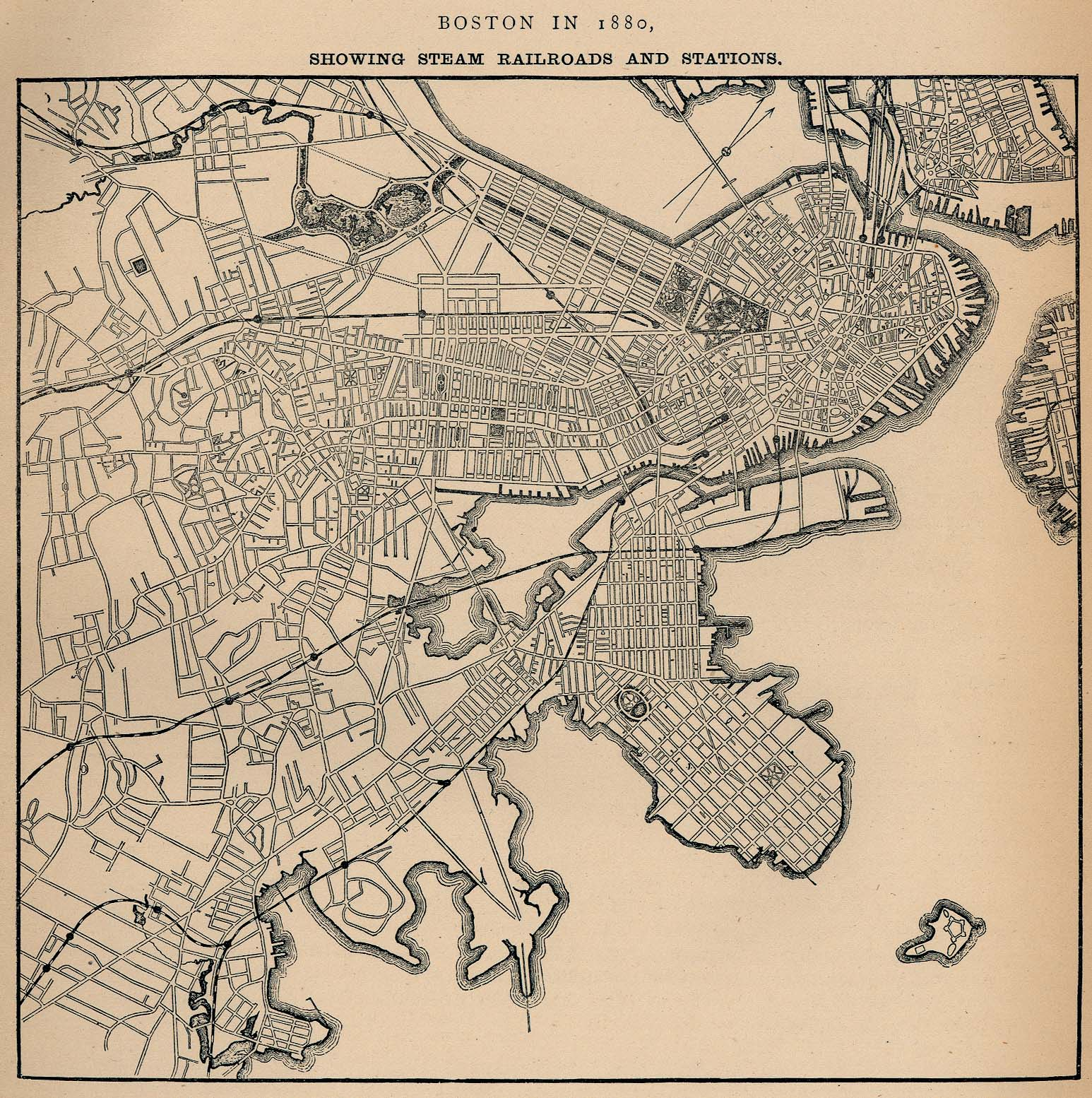
Fort Point channel (center) in 1880, showing old railroad and street crossings

The following bridges and tunnels cross or used to cross the channel, from north to south, with building/opening dates:

- Northern Avenue Bridge (built 1908, closed to vehicles in 1997, closed to pedestrians in 2014)
- Evelyn Moakley Bridge (1996, New Northern Avenue/Seaport Boulevard)
- Silver Line tunnel, 2004
- Congress Street Bridge, 1930 (replaced an 1874-built swing bridge at same location)
- Summer Street Bridge, 1899
  - Previously at this location: New York and New England Railroad (shifted to Boston and Providence terminal in Park Square during construction of South Station which opened in 1899)
- Red Line tunnel, 1917, which runs along the length of the channel south from Summer Street (see 1925 map)
- Mount Washington Avenue Bridge - Swing bridge built in 1855 to connect Kneeland Street to Commonwealth Flats. Since demolished; Mount Washington Ave now enters the Gillette plant. The connection was severed by the construction of South Station (opened 1899).
- Fort Point Channel Tunnel (1994, I-90)
- Dorchester Avenue Bridge
  - North Free Bridge, 1826
  - Federal Street Bridge, 1925. Federal Street was rerouted around the new South Station (1899) and renamed Dorchester Avenue, creating some skew with the bridge
- Atlantic Avenue Viaduct (1899–1923)
- MBTA Commuter Rail bridge, fixed span constructed in 1988. It is used by four MBTA Commuter Rail lines (Fairmount Line, Fall River/New Bedford, Kingston Line, Greenbush Line), as well as for non-revenue MBTA and Amtrak trains to access Southampton Street Yard. Previously at this location:
  - Six-track, three span Rolling Lift Bridge constructed 1898–1900 to provide combined connection to the new South Station for the Old Colony Railroad and New York and New England Railroad (via Fairmount). By the time of completion, these railroads had merged into the New York, New Haven and Hartford Railroad. Remnants memorialized in Rolling Bridge Park, at the same location.
  - Original bridge for the Old Colony Railroad, demolished in 1910 (on the site of the 1988 bridge).
- Broadway Bridge; also spans the MBTA Red Line Cabot Yard.
  - Originally built 1871, failed due to structural defects
  - Replaced in 1877 with rim-bearing swing truss bridge
  - Replaced in 1914 with center-bearing swing truss bridge
  - Current bridge opened January 19, 1999 in a slightly different location to make room for Big Dig ramps

The channel now ends here; the remaining bridges cross a tangle of railroad facilities built on landfill and inherited from the New York, New Haven and Hartford Railroad: the MBTA Red Line's Cabot Yard, MBTA Commuter Rail tracks shared by the Fairmount Line and Old Colony lines, and the Commuter Rail/Amtrak Southampton Street Yard.

- West Fourth Street Bridge, 1958
  - Replaced the Dover Street Bridge, built 1877, with wood-decked sections that split apart diagonally under actual horsepower
- South Boston Bypass Road (opened in 1993 as part of the Big Dig going east from I-93; follows depressed NY&NE corridor, now Track 61)
- New York and New England Railroad on a long diagonal bridge, now used by the MBTA Commuter Rail and trains to the South Boston Freight Terminal - this bridge passed under the next two
- Southampton Street (formerly Swett Street)
- Massachusetts Avenue (formerly East Chester Park)

== See also ==
- Children's Wharf, formerly known as Museum Wharf
- Fort Point Channel Historic District, added to NRHP in 2004
- Summer Street Bridge disaster, which occurred on November 7, 1916
