= Bill Russell Bridge =

Bridge in Boston, Massachusetts, US

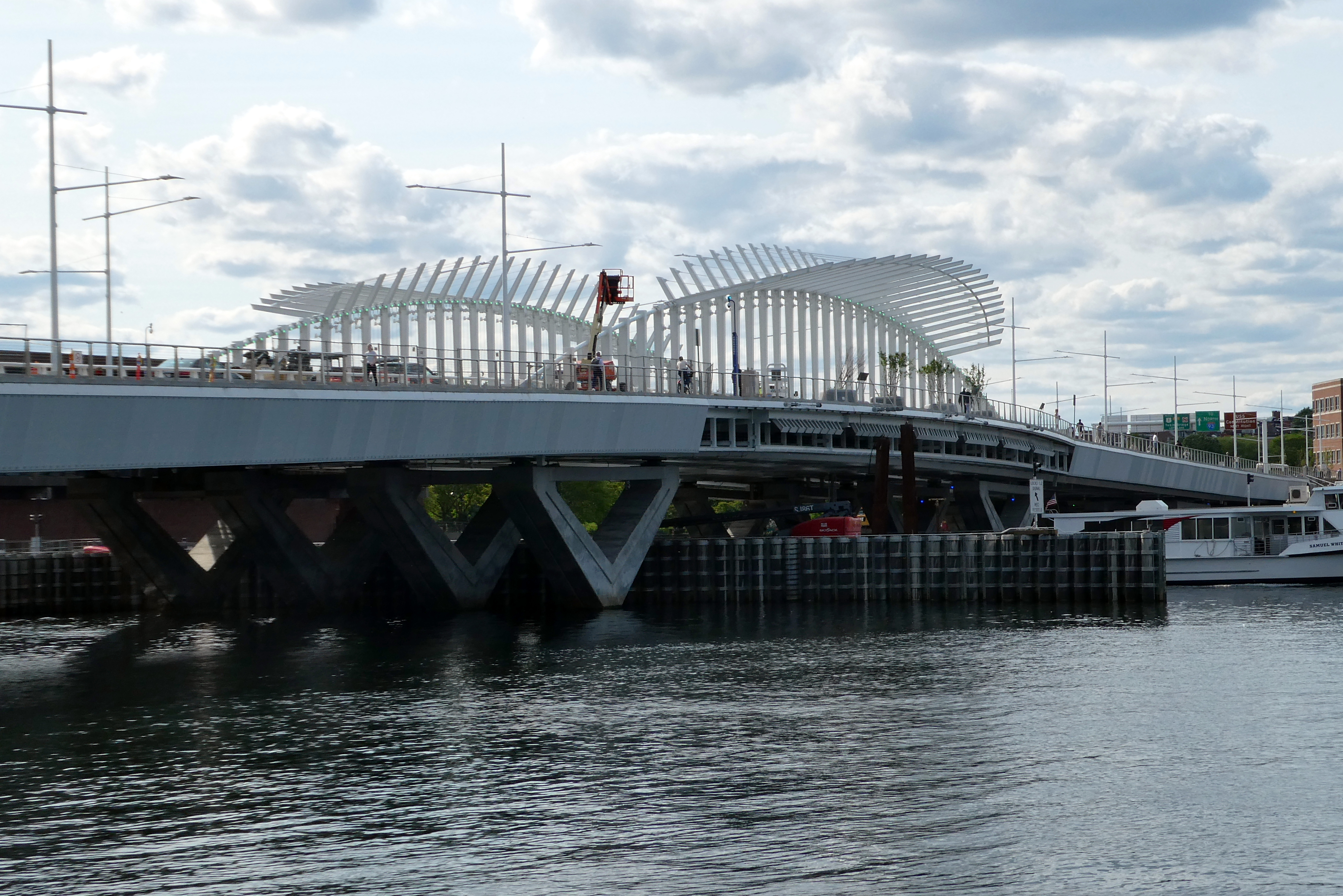
- Bill Russell Bridge in June 2025
- Coordinates: 42°22′08″N 71°03′36″W
- Carries: North Washington Street
- Crosses: Charles River
- Locale: Boston, Massachusetts, U.S.
- Official name: North Washington Street Bridge (until 2024); William Felton "Bill" Russell Bridge (2024–present)
- Other name: North End Bridge
- Maintained by: City of Boston

Characteristics
- Design: Plate girder bridge approaches, with truss swing span (1900); Fixed-span bridge (2025)
- Total length: 1,089 ft (332 m)
- Width: 66 ft (20 m)
- No. of spans: One (241.2 ft [73.5 m])

History
- Designer: William Jackson (1900); Miguel Rosales (2025)
- Construction start: 1898, 2018
- Construction end: 1900, 2025
- Opened: 1900, 2025
- Replaces: Charles River Bridge (1786)

Statistics
- Daily traffic: 38,400 cars/day (2010)

Location
- Interactive map of Bill Russell Bridge

The Bill Russell Bridge, officially the William Felton "Bill" Russell Bridge, is located in Boston and spans the Charles River. As the river's easternmost crossing, the bridge connects the neighborhoods of Charlestown and the North End. The bridge carries a portion of the Freedom Trail linking to the USS Constitution and Bunker Hill. To the north of the bridge, Route 99 begins and the street becomes New Rutherford Avenue.

The original structure was completed in 1900. Replacement of that bridge started in fall 2018; following several delays, construction was completed in 2025. The new bridge was named in honor of Bill Russell, a notable figure in the history of the Boston Celtics and a recipient of the Presidential Medal of Freedom, in October 2024.

== Prior bridges ==
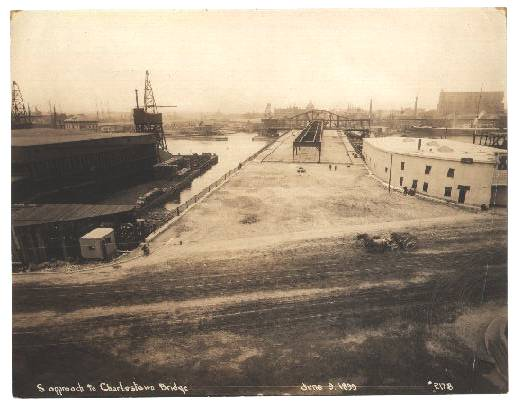
The Charlestown Bridge under construction in 1899

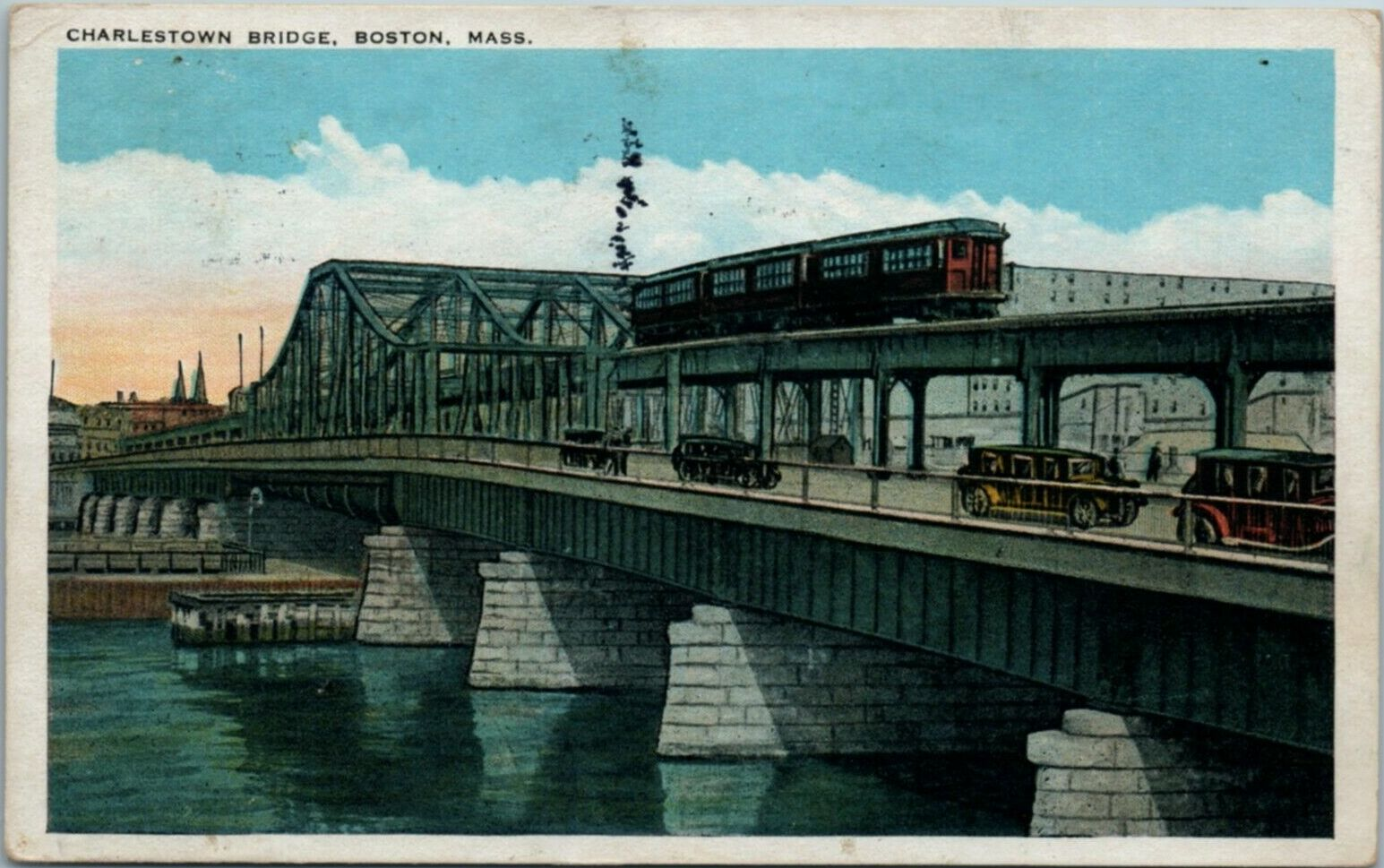
The North Washington Street Bridge in 1929, showing both automotive and elevated railway traffic

The first government-sanctioned ferry crossing of the Charles was chartered at this location in the 1630s. It was operated by various individuals until it was given to Harvard College "in perpetuity" in 1640, to support the college financially. In 1640, the Massachusetts General Court granted Harvard College the revenue from the Boston-Charlestown ferry to help support the institution. The Harvard Corporation in its capacity managed the Charlestown ferry from the 1640s until 1785, and after the completion of the Charles River Bridge in 1785.

The first bridge on this site was known as the Charles River Bridge, chartered in 1785 and opened on June 17, 1786. As a condition of chartering the bridge, a sum of £200 was paid annually to Harvard College to compensate for the lost ferry income. The bridge was privately built and operated, with tolls producing profits for the investors during the charter period, after the initial expense was paid off. In 1792, the West Boston Bridge was chartered, connecting West Boston to Cambridge. In compensation, the legislature extended the charter period of the Charles River Bridge by 30 years, but the unpopular double tolls on Sundays were eliminated. Traffic to the bridge was facilitated by the laying out of the Medford Turnpike in 1803.

When the Warren Bridge was chartered in 1828 in a location extremely close to the Charles River Bridge, the investors filed a lawsuit which eventually reached the United States Supreme Court as Charles River Bridge v. Warren Bridge.

The bridge that stood into the 21st century was built in 1900 under chief engineer William Jackson, and was designed to carry the Charlestown Elevated railway in addition to vehicle traffic. The Jackson-designed bridge consisted of 12 spans totaling approximately 1,000 feet (300 m), with a center swing span that was permanently closed in 1961.

The railway was demolished in 1975 to make way for its replacement, the MBTA Orange Line's Haymarket North Extension. The new line was rerouted to avoid having to pass directly through the densely populated Charlestown neighborhood.

The Haymarket Tunnel, emerging from under both North Station and the Charles River just south of the new Orange Line Community College station, was inaugurated in 1975 as the designated tunnel for Orange Line trains.

Because the bridge was originally designed to accommodate an elevated railroad in addition to automobiles, the bridge spanned six lanes. In 2003, the center two lanes were permanently closed.

The bridge formerly carried the southernmost stretch of Massachusetts Route 99 to its terminus at the river, but following completion of the Big Dig in the late 2000s, the route's designation was changed to relocate the terminus to Chelsea Street in Charlestown.

== Current bridge ==
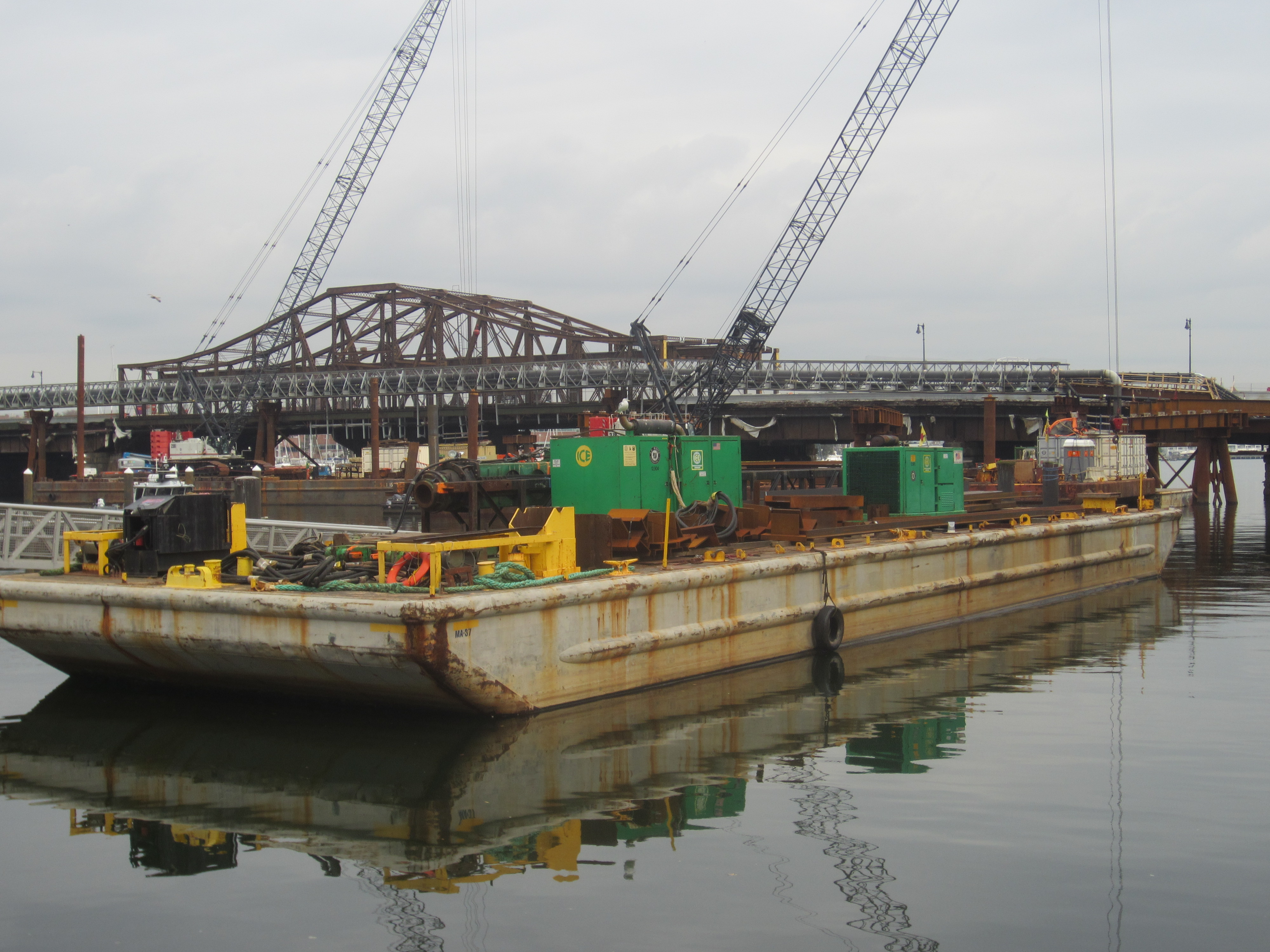
Construction of the new bridge in 2019

Construction work on a replacement bridge began in the fall of 2018. The design for the new bridge, by architect Miguel Rosales in collaboration with Alfred Benesch & Company, was intended to complement the nearby Zakim Bridge (with which Rosales was also involved). The new bridge was designed to have two vehicular lanes in each direction, a dedicated southbound bus lane, and a protected bicycle lane and sidewalk on each side. The dedicated bus lane was reported to be the first on a bridge in Boston.

During construction, a temporary bridge was installed to carry pedestrians and three lanes of vehicular traffic.

The new $180 million bridge was expected to be completed in 2023 to coincide with the 20th anniversary of the Zakim Bridge. However, due to defects discovered on September 29, 2021, in some of the welds/connections of a portion of the installed steel tub girders, project completion was delayed into early 2025. As of July 2025, work was expected to last into August. The new bridge was dedicated on September 24, 2025.

== Naming ==
The bridge (both the structure built in 1900 and its replacement) was officially named the North Washington Street Bridge until 2024. In October 2024, the new bridge was officially named the William Felton "Bill" Russell Bridge in honor of Bill Russell. Russell was a player and player-coach for the Boston Celtics during 1956–1969, during which the team won 11 NBA championships.

Locally, the bridge was commonly known as the Charlestown Bridge, although The Boston Globe noted that residents of Charlestown called it the North End Bridge. When the bridge was renamed in 2024, the Globe said the renaming of the bridge after Bill Russell "puts an end to the hundred-year argument over whether the span should be known as the 'Charlestown Bridge' or the 'North End Bridge'."
