= John Joseph Moakley United States Courthouse =

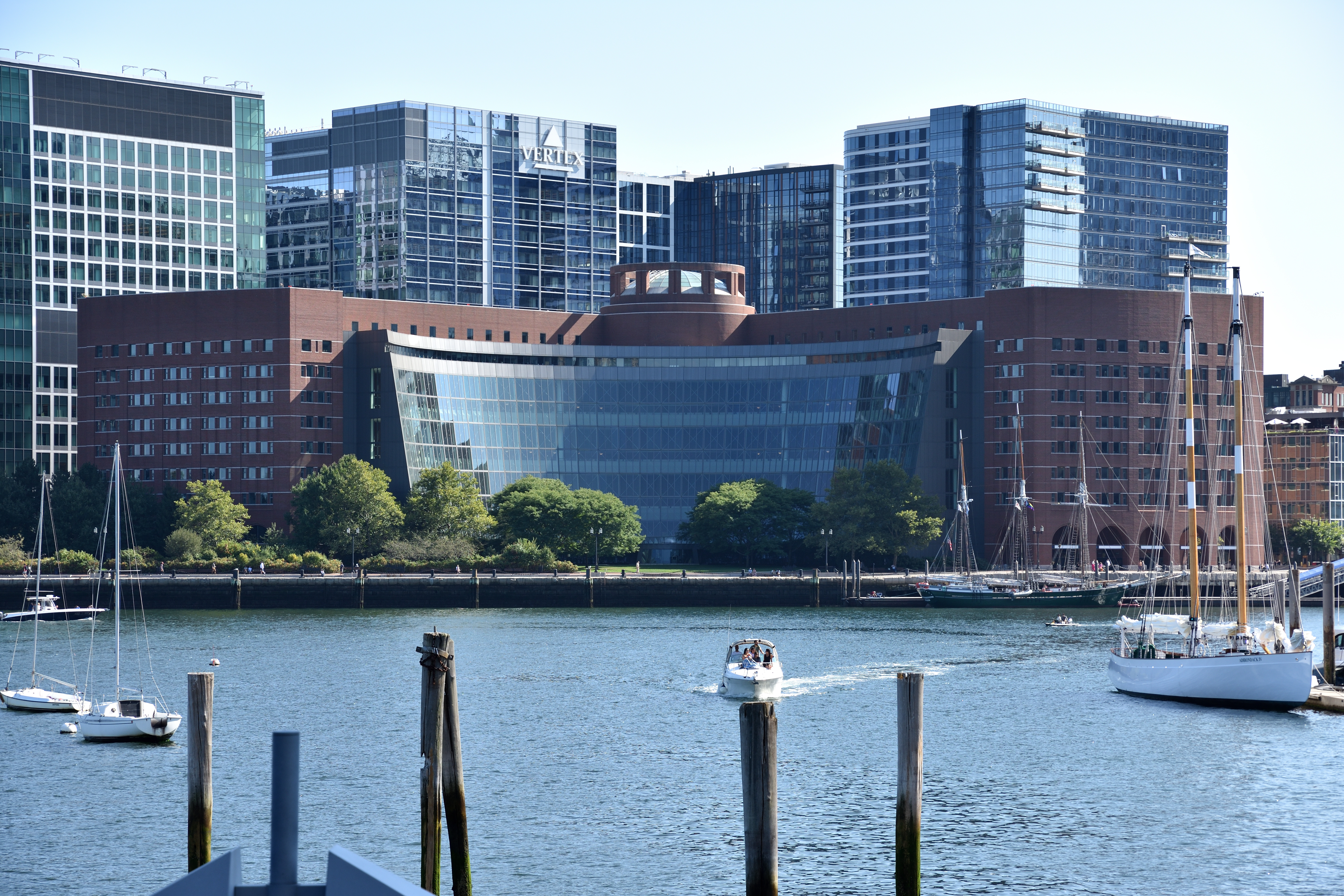
- The courthouse seen from Central Wharf in 2024

- Location within Boston

General information
- Status: Completed
- Type: Federal Courthouse
- Location: 1 Courthouse Way, Boston, Massachusetts 02210; U.S.
- Coordinates: 42°21′14″N 71°2′49″W
- Elevation: 4 feet (1.2 m) Above mean sea level
- Current tenants: • United States Court of Appeals for the First Circuit • United States District Court for the District of Massachusetts
- Completed: 1999
- Cost: $170 million
- Owner: United States federal government

Technical details
- Floor count: 10
- Floor area: 675,000 square feet (62,700 m^{2})

Design and construction
- Architecture firm: Pei Cobb Freed & Partners
- Structural engineer: LeMessurier Consultants
- Main contractor: Clark Construction Group, Inc

The John Joseph Moakley United States Courthouse is a federal courthouse for the United States Court of Appeals for the First Circuit and the United States District Court for the District of Massachusetts, located on Fan Pier on the Boston, Massachusetts, waterfront. Named after Congressman Joe Moakley, the 675,000-square-foot (62,700 m^{2}) building was completed in 1999 at a cost of $170 million and has won many design awards.

The courthouse is served by a stop on Boston's Silver Line.

== Details ==
The courthouse serves as headquarters for the United States Court of Appeals for the First Circuit and the United States District Court for the District of Massachusetts. The building houses two courtrooms for the Court of Appeals and 25 courtrooms for the District Court, as well as 40 judges' chambers, a Circuit law library, the office of a United States congressman, offices for the United States attorney, extensive support facilities for the United States Marshals service and Pre-Trial and Probation services, as well as a day-care facility. The 675,000-square-foot (62,700 m^{2}) building, clad in water-struck brick with granite trim, has ten floors above grade and one below.

It was the first major project to be awarded as part of the United States Court Design Guidelines and incorporates General Services Administration's goals for imparting dignity and social significance, while creating modern and innovative justice architecture. Associate Justice Stephen Breyer, who was serving as Chief Judge of the First Circuit at the time and is also on the Board that selects the Pritzker Architecture Prize, helped oversee the design and construction of the building and credits the project for sparking his interest in architecture.

Public access to the courtrooms is provided through a sequence of spaces — Entrance Hall, Rotunda, Great Hall, and Galleries. Twenty-one large-scale paintings were commissioned from Ellsworth Kelly and are installed in these areas.

The courtrooms themselves are distinguished by a motif of large arches defined by wood moldings and stenciled ornament.

The sub-basement houses an ice storage air conditioning system which uses half-price electricity at night to freeze water, which is then used to cool the courthouse during hot days. This saves an estimated $1.5 million per year, and helps load-balance the regional electricity grid.

== Design team ==
- Design Architect – Henry N. Cobb and Ian Bader of Pei Cobb Freed & Partners, New York
- Interior Design – Pei Cobb Freed & Partners, New York City
- Executive Architect – Jung Brannen Associates, Boston
- Structural Engineer – LeMessurier Consultants, Cambridge, Massachusetts
- General Contractor – Clark Construction Group, Inc
- Mechanical/Electrical Engineer – Cosentini Associates LLP, New York City
- Courts Design Consultant – Gruzen Samton, New York City
- Landscape Architect – OLIN, Philadelphia, and Carol R. Johnson & Associates, Cambridge, Massachusetts
- Lighting Designer - Lam Partners Inc, Cambridge, Massachusetts

== Design awards ==
- 2000 National Endowment for the Arts: Presidential Design Awards: Federal Design Achievement
- 1999 American Institute of Architects: District of Columbia Chapter: Award of Merit
- 1999 Dupont Benedictus Award for Innovation in Architectural Laminated glass
- 1999 Saflex Safe & Sound Award: First Annual Award for the Use of Laminated Glass in Design
- 1997 American Institute of Architects / Brick Institute of America: Brick in Architecture Award
- 1997 General Services Administration: Honor Award for Design

== See also ==
- List of courthouses in Boston
