= Charles Warren (author) =

American legal scholar (1868–1954)

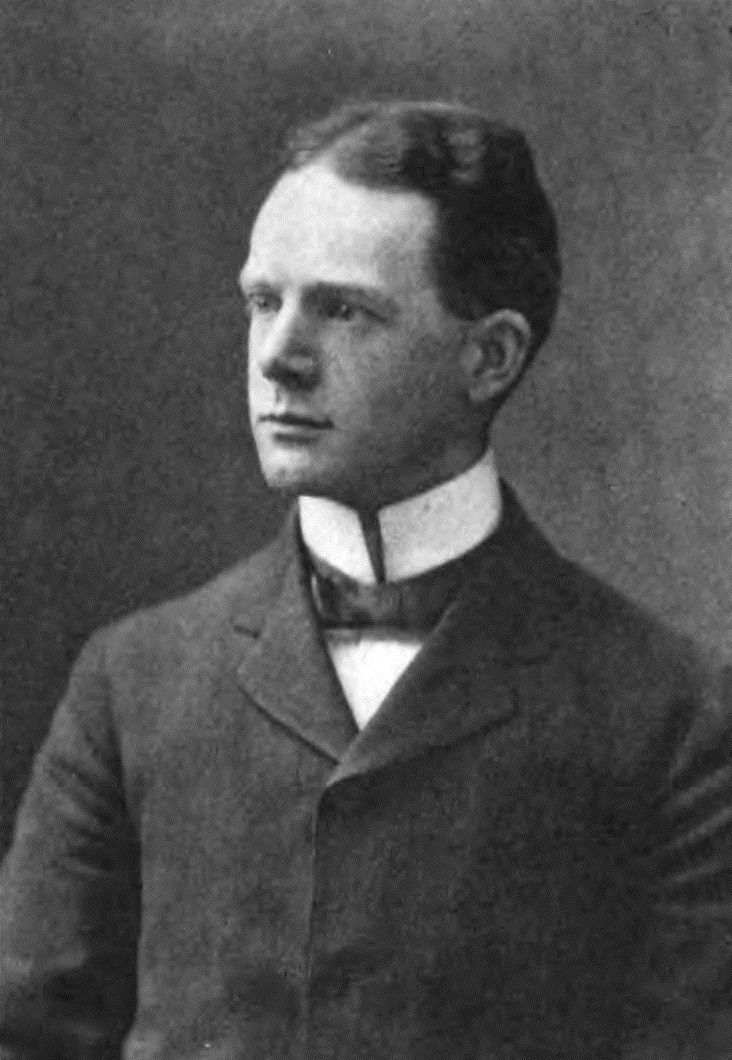
From the October 1900 issue of The Book Buyer magazine

Charles Warren (March 9, 1868 – August 16, 1954) was an American lawyer and legal scholar who won a Pulitzer Prize for his book The Supreme Court in United States History (1922).

== Early life ==
Warren was born in Boston, Massachusetts, a great-great-grandson of Mercy Otis Warren and the son of lawyer Winslow Warren (collector of the Port of Boston) and Mary Lincoln Tinkham. The family moved to Dedham, Massachusetts, when Charles was three, where his biographer notes the family "remained active and loyal Democrats in a bastion of Republicanism." Warren was descended from three Mayflower passengers.

Following family tradition, he attended Harvard University, receiving an A.B. in 1889 and an A.M from Harvard Law School in 1892. Much later, in 1933, Warren would receive an honorary doctor of laws degree from Columbia Law School.

== Career ==
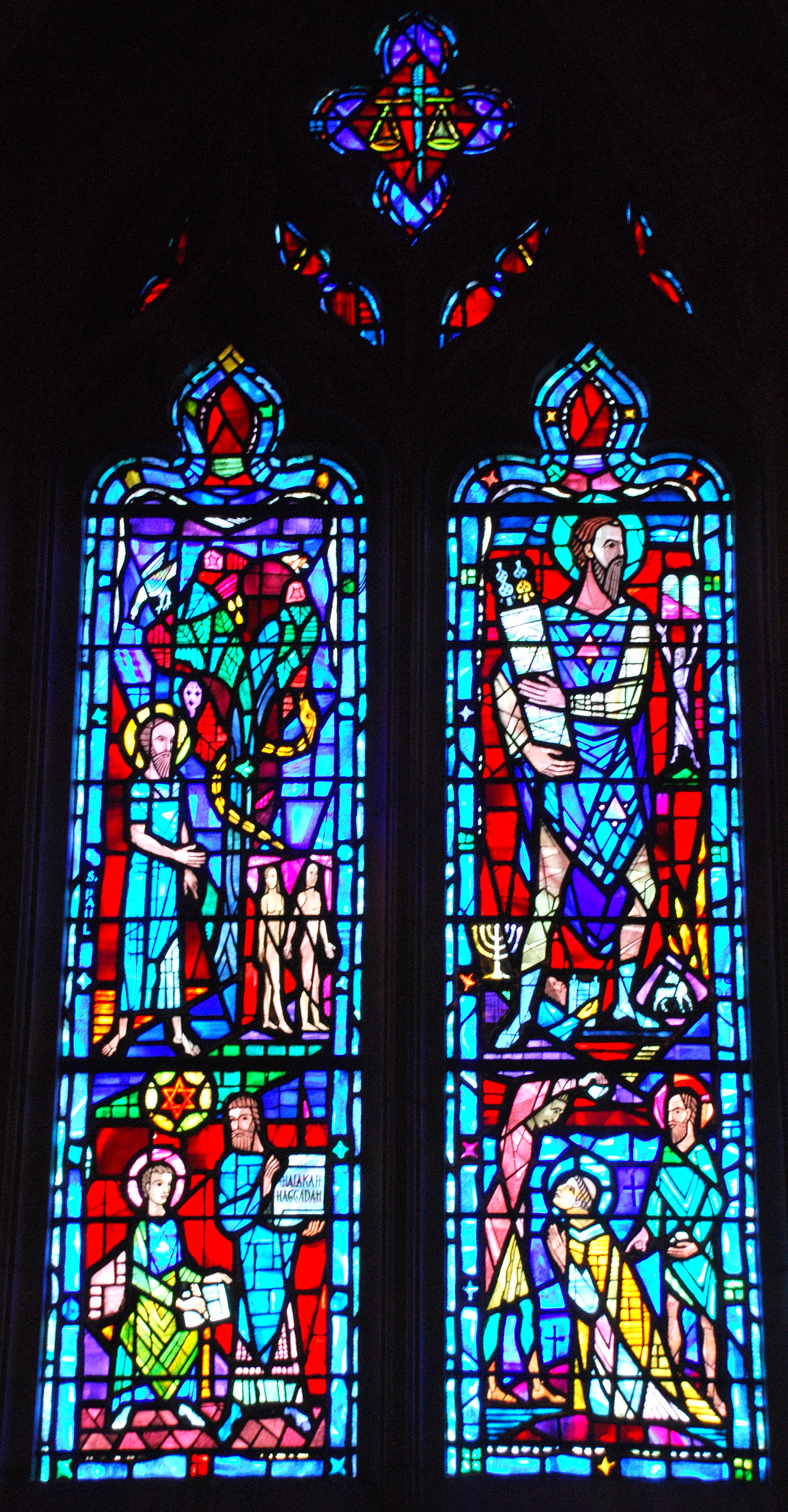
Stained glass window dedicated to Charles Warren in the National Cathedral, Washington, DC, USA

Warren began practicing law in Boston in Moorfield Storey's firm, but left after less than a year to accept a job as the private secretary to Massachusetts governor William Eustis Russell.

Warren was an active member of the Young Men's Democratic Club, but lost both his attempts to gain elective office (as state senator in 1894 and 1895).

On May 31, 1894, Warren founded the Immigration Restriction League with his fellow Harvard graduates Prescott F. Hall and Robert DeCourcy Ward. The organization advocated excluding new immigrants from southern and eastern Europe because of their allegedly inferior "racial qualities" compared to Anglo-Saxons. Warren supported this cause by publishing short stories in national magazines including 'Scribner's,' 'McClure's,' and the 'Atlantic.' He also opposed women's suffrage, bimetallism, protectionism and imperialism. The organization spread to other American cities, and lasted approximately two decades, disbanding after Hall's 1921 death.

Warren joined Russell's law firm as an associate when the governor's term ended in 1894, and later formed Warren & Perry, where he practiced law from 1897 to 1914. He handled various types of cases: criminal, real estate, domestic relations and corporate. His most famous case defended James Michael Curley, who was convicted for conspiracy to defraud the United States for taking the civil service examination for a constituent. In 1905, Warren became chair of the Massachusetts State Civil Service Commission, where he served until 1911, when a candidate backed by Martin Lomasney, one of the powerful machine politicians against which the patrician progressive worked, won.

Warren then concentrated on his law practice and writing career, as well as became involved in national progressive politics. In addition to law review articles, Warren published two encyclopedic books which became the starting point for American legal historians for decades: History of the Harvard Law School and of Early Legal Conditions in America (3 Vol. 1909) and A History of the American Bar.

Warren served on the executive committee of the Massachusetts Woodrow Wilson League in 1912. The successful presidential candidate appointed Warren Assistant Attorney General, and he served from June 1914 to April 1918. The looming World War caused Warren to become involved in internal security and international relations matters including drafting the Espionage Act of 1917. Warren also drafted legal briefs and argued before the United States Supreme Court approximately 30 times.

After the war (and Wilson's death), Warren remained in Washington, D.C., and received several appointments as special master from the Supreme Court for disputes involving state boundaries and water rights. The State Department also consulted Warren concerning neutrality matters in the 1930s.

Publication of his three-volume History of the United States Supreme Court in 1922 cemented Warren's reputation as a legal scholar, and it won the Pulitzer Prize for history in 1923. Warren disagreed with historian Charles A. Beard's economic analysis of the Constitution published in 1912, but by 1925 as a progressive Warren agreed that the court's conservative analysis was strait-jacketing Congress, a theme he elaborated in Congress, the Constitution, and the Supreme Court. Justice Louis Brandeis cited the work (revised in 1935) in Erie Railroad Co. v. Tompkins (1938), which cut back on forum-shopping by wealthy litigants using the old case of Swift v. Tyson (1842). Warren also published Bankruptcy in United States History in 1935, based on lectures he had given at Northwestern University School of Law. Other schools at which the legal historian lectured included the University of Rochester, Boston University School of Law, Johns Hopkins University, the University of Virginia, the University of Chicago, and several others.

Warren was elected to the American Philosophical Society in 1939.

Warren retired from public service in the 1940s. He married Annie Louise Bliss in 1904, and they celebrated their fiftieth anniversary before his death. They had no children.

== Death and legacy ==
Warren died in Washington, D.C. A window in the National Cathedral is dedicated in his memory, above a commemorative plaque. At his alma mater, the research center for North American history, funded by his widow, is named after Warren. The Library of Congress received many of his papers. His autobiographical notes are held by the Massachusetts Historical Society and Columbia University's Oral History Collection.

== Selected works ==
- History of the Harvard Law School and of Early Legal Conditions in America (1908)
- A History of the American Bar. 1911.
- The Supreme Court in United States History (3 volumes, 1922) (2 vol. revised edition 1928)
- The Supreme Court and Sovereign States (1924)
- The Making of the Constitution (1928; rev. ed 1937)
- Congress, the Constitution and the Supreme Court (1925; rev. ed. 1935)
- Congress as Santa Claus; or, National Donations and the General Welfare Clause of the Constitution (1932)
- Troubles of a Neutral (1934)
- Bankruptcy in United States History (1935)
- Odd Byways in American History (1942)
