= Karl Jelinek =

Austrian physicist and meteorologist

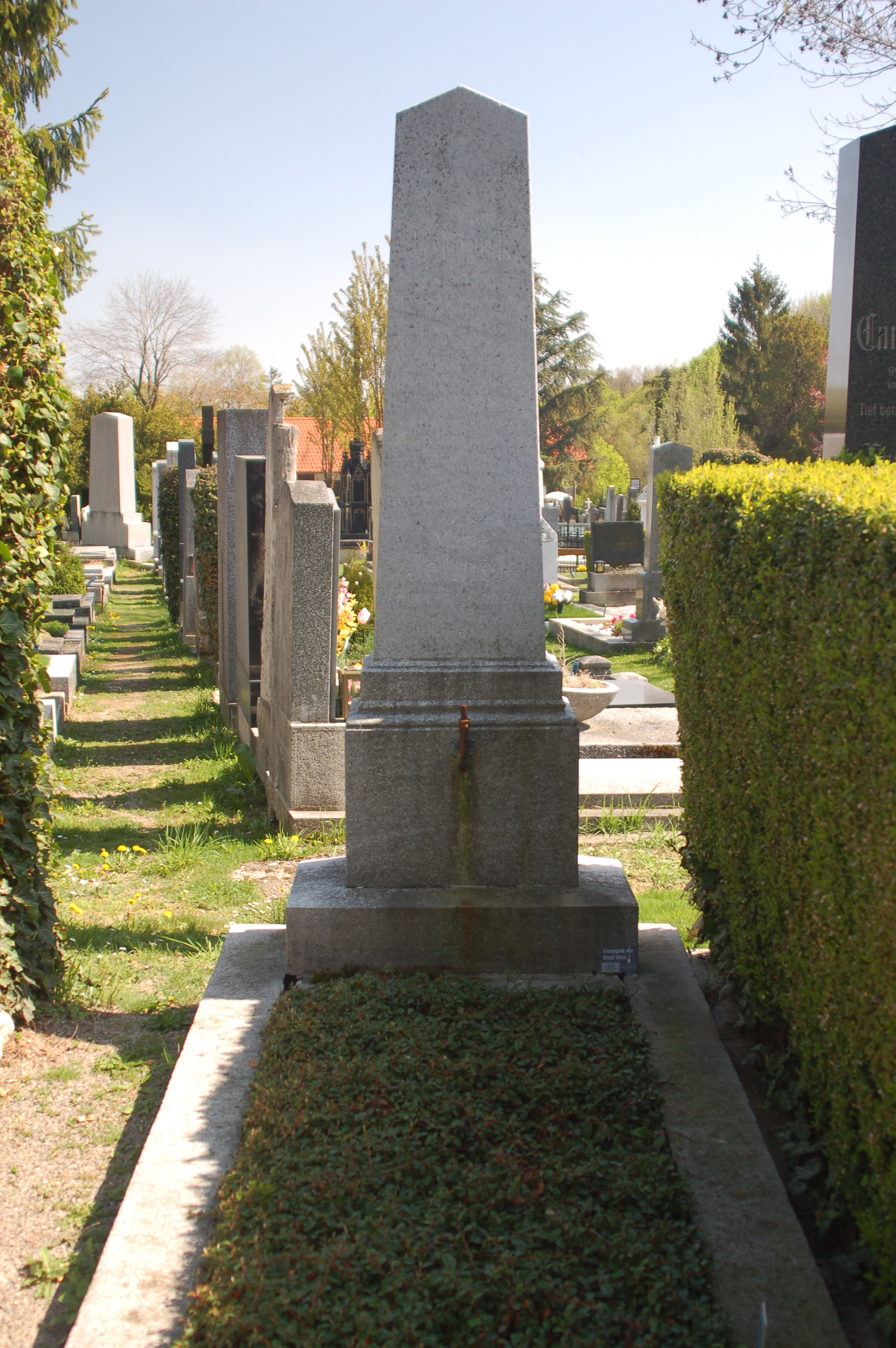
- Grave marker of Karl Jelinek at Heiligenstädter Friedhof in Vienna.
- Born: 23 April 1822; Brno, Prague
- Died: 19 October 1876 (aged 54); Vienna
- Occupation: Meteorologist; physicist; mathematician; astronomer; historian; geophysicist
- Employer: Central Institution for Meteorology and Geodynamics; University of Vienna

Karl Jelinek (23 April 1822 in Brünn – 19 October 1876 in Vienna) was an Austrian physicist and meteorologist.

== Biography ==
From 1839 to 1843 he studied law at the University of Vienna, where he also attended lectures given by mathematician Joseph Petzval, physicist Andreas von Ettingshausen and astronomer Joseph Johann Littrow. After graduation, he worked as an assistant at observatories in Vienna (1843–47) and Prague (1847–52). In 1852 he was named a professor of mathematics at the Polytechnic Institute in Prague, and in 1863, succeeded Karl Kreil as director of the Centralanstalt für Meteorologie und Erdmagnetismus (Central Institute for Meteorology and Geomagnetism) in Vienna. From 1863, he also served as a professor of physics at the University of Vienna.

In 1865 he founded the Österreichische Gesellschaft für Meteorologie (Austrian Society of Meteorology), of which, with Julius von Hann, he was editor of the organization's Zeitschrift (magazine).

== Selected writings ==
- Beiträge zur construction selbstregistrirender meteorologischer apparate, 1850 – Contributions to the construction of self-registering meteorological instruments.
- Psychrometer-Tafeln für das hunderttheilige Thermometer, 1876 – Psychrometer tables for the centigrade thermometer.
- Über den jährlichen Gang der Temperatur und des Luftdruckes in Österreich und an einigen benachbarten Stationen, 1867 – On the daily changes in temperature according to the observations of meteorological stations in Austria.
- Jelinek's anleitung zur ausführung meteorologischer beobachtungen nebst einer sammlung von hilfstafeln, 1884 (with Julius von Hann) – Jelinek's guide to accomplishing meteorological observations.
