= Central Institution for Meteorology and Geodynamics =

National meteorological and geophysical service of Austria

- Zentralanstalt für Meteorologie und Geodynamik; ZAMG

Agency overview
- Formed: 23 July 1851
- Dissolved: 31 December 2022
- Superseding agency: GeoSphere Austria
- Jurisdiction: (Austria) Austrian Federal Government
- Headquarters: Hohe Warte, Vienna
- Agency executive: Dr Andreas Schaffhauser
- Parent agency: Federal Ministry of Science and Research
- Website: www.zamg.ac.at

The Central Institution for Meteorology and Geodynamics (German: Zentralanstalt für Meteorologie und Geodynamik, ZAMG) was the national meteorological and geophysical service of Austria.

It was a subordinate agency of the Federal Ministry of Education, Science and Research. The ZAMG headquarters were located in Vienna, with regional offices in Salzburg, Innsbruck, Graz and Klagenfurt.

ZAMG was founded in 1851 and merged with the Geological Survey of Austria into GeoSphere Austria in 2023. Under this new umbrella it is the oldest weather service in the world. Its task is not only to operate monitoring networks and to conduct research in various fields, but also to make the results available to the public.

== Organization ==
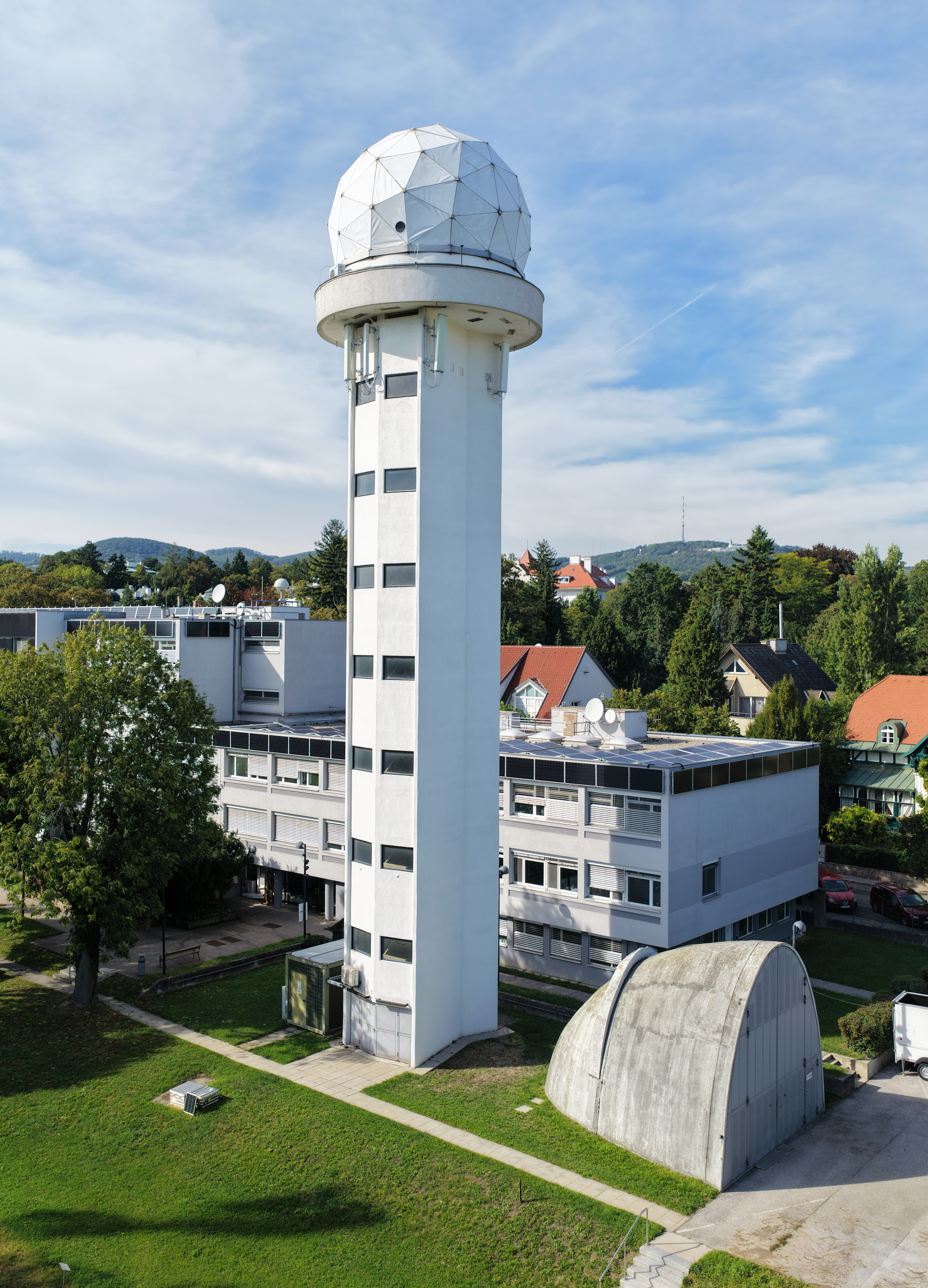
ZAMG headquarters with weather radar tower

The Hohe Warte in the Döbling district of Vienna was the headquarters of the Institution and the regional office for Vienna, Lower Austria and Burgenland. Other regional ZAMG offices were:

- Regional office for Salzburg and Upper Austria (city of Salzburg)
- Regional office for Vorarlberg and Tyrol (Innsbruck)
- Regional office for Carinthia (Klagenfurt)
- Regional office for Styria (Graz)

Other ZAMG facilities and observatories include:

- Hoher Sonnblick Observatory
- Conrad Observatory, Muggendorf

The grounds of the Institution has a radar tower. This office building is now home to a large meteorology and geophysics library.

== Departments ==
The ZAMG was organized as a semi-autonomous institution. ZAMG was divided into departments, including the following:

- The synoptic scale metrology department was responsible for providing daily forecasting services using modern technology.
- The geophysics department provided information on earthquakes and the geomagnetic field.
- The climate department used data obtained from the Austrian Monitoring Network to create climate statistics and maps. This department also conducted research into Austria's climate and how it is changing, which includes work on glaciology.
- The technical department was in charge of the meteorological monitoring network, which consists of semi-automatic weather detection systems (TAWES stations) and semi-automatic climate stations (TAKLIS stations).
- The environmental meteorology department studied the spread of pollutants in the atmosphere. One of its tasks was to provide the government with information in the event of a crisis (e.g. radioactivity in the atmosphere).
- The data processing department used the latest equipment to manage the extensive computer-controlled processes.

=== Climate ===
One of ZAMG's key tasks was to observe and explore the climate in Austria. A network of over two hundred semi-automatic weather stations (TAWES) throughout Austria is in place for this purpose. Meteorological parameters such as pressure, temperature, wind and precipitation are recorded from Lake Constance to Lake Neusiedl, and from the plains to the mountains (Sonnblick Date Observatory). This data is the basis for climate research and is particularly important for understanding current climate change.

=== Synoptic scale and environmental metrology ===
The synoptic scale metrology department dealt with areas of remote sensing, using manual and automatic interpretation of satellite and radar data to make forecasts. In the field of numerical models, research focused on the development of LAM Aladin, as in the new development of nowcasting model INCA.

=== Environment ===
The environmental meteorology department dealt with the spread of pollutants in the atmosphere and the meteorological processes that affect the spread of pollutants. This was one of the priorities of the department's applied research in this area.

=== Geophysics ===
The first regional geomagnetic survey of the Austrio-Hungarian crown lands was conducted by Karl Kreil in 1846–1851. On the occasion of the earthquake in Ljubljana, Slovenia, in 1895, the Austrian Seismological Service was founded. Since then, research has been carried out continuously in both fields. Today's activities include geophysical and environmental issues.

== History ==
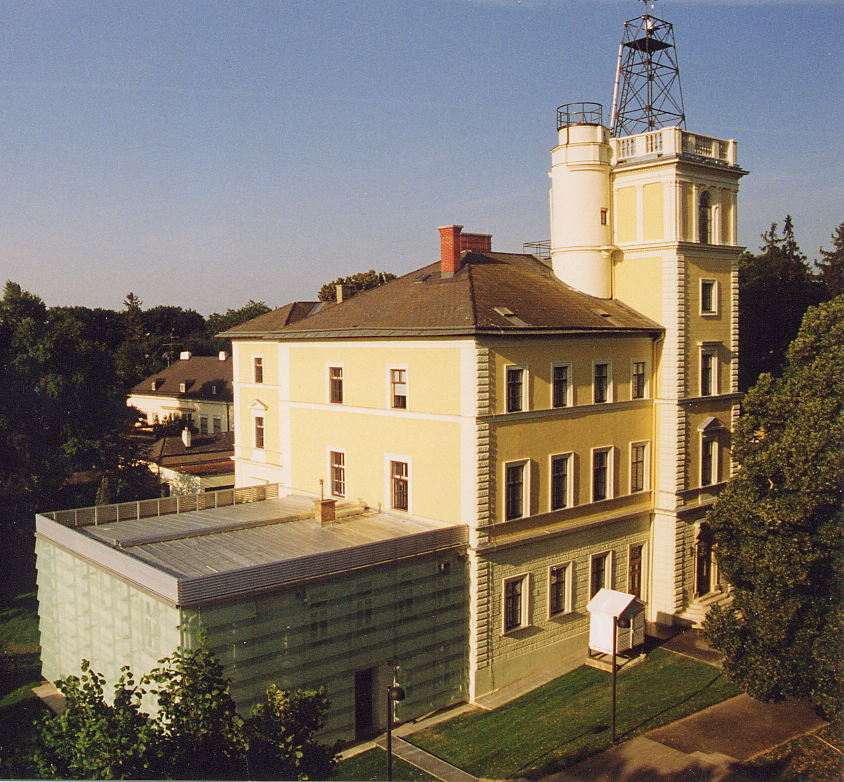
Julius-Hann-Haus, Hohe Warte, Vienna

On 23 July 1851 Emperor Franz Joseph approved the establishment of "a central institution for meteorological and magnetic observations", the Central Institution for Meteorology and Earth Magnetism, which dates back to an initiative of the Austrian Academy of Sciences. This sent the request in 1848 to Karl Kreil, director of the observatory at Prague, and full member of the academy, a meteorological observation system for the Austrian monarchy designing.

Karl Kreil (1798–1862) became the first director of the newly founded Central Institution of Wieden, and also professor of physics at the University of Vienna. This personal union between one hand and Director of University Teachers on the other, remained to this day and lasting influence on the scientific research at the Central Institution. Kreil set up a meteorological observation system for the entire territory of the Austrian monarchy and carried out for this also the first country geomagnetic recording. 1865, began at the Central Institution with the publication of a daily weather map. Karl Jelinek succeeded him.

1872 moved to Central, in the new and final quarters of the Hohe Warte in Vienna Dobling which Henry Ferstel built. A year later, in 1873, the Central Institution organized the first international meteorological congress in Vienna, founded the International Meteorological Organization (IMO) as a precursor of the World Meteorological Organization (WMO).

In 1877 the output of daily telegraphic weather reports carried out, with a synoptic map and the forecast for the next day. The new report contained the morning of 60 observation stations from all over Europe, including 24 domestic ones.

By decree of 23 February 1904, was transferred to the Central Institution for the entire seismic Austria, which took the name change to Central Institution for Meteorology and Geodynamics after him.

In his position as Director Kreil followed by outstanding scientists, including Julius Hann (1839–1921) and Felix Maria von Exner (1876–1930). Hanns was important in climatology and a worldwide began to be in his era as one, meteorologists Austrian school — Hann also wrote the Comprehensive Textbook of Meteorology (1901) talking about — that one remembers Exner as a great theorist and his work of Dynamic Meteorology (1925).

Many other researchers such as Max Margules (1856–1920), founder of theoretical meteorology and Victor Conrad (1876–1962), discoverer of the discontinuity in the middle of the crust named after him, worked at the Institution.

Only once did the tradition of the Central Institution was cut short after the annexation of Austria into the German Reich in climate and weather had to be relocated to Berlin, where it to the German Reich Meteorological were placed, and the Central Institution in Vienna in order to be transformed into a research institution.

After World War II the Institution was restored to its original state and there was a considerable human and geographic expansion of the Central Institution, which also reflected in the numerous scientific research. In 1957 a house on the neighboring property was purchased and subsequently adapted for office use; between 1967 and 1973 a radar tower, a balloon-filling house and a new office building including specialised libraries were built at the site of the Central Institution.

With the New Year 2023, ZAMG and the Geological Survey of Austria were merged into a new agency called GeoSphere Austria.

== See also ==
- Meteoalarm
