= Hohe Warte (Vienna) =

Built-up hill in Vienna

Coordinates: 48°14′58″N 16°21′28″E

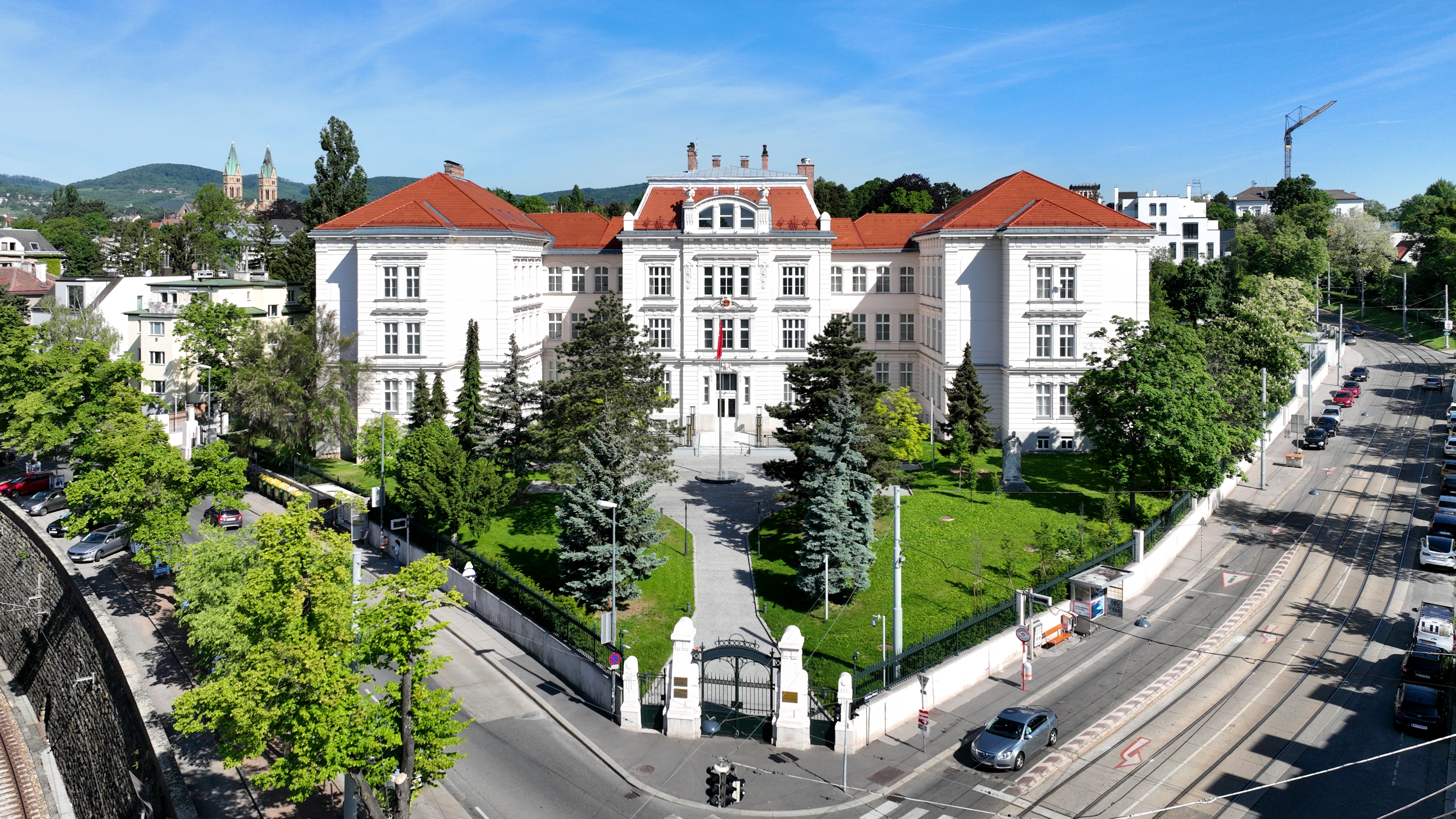
Villa Hohe Warte, a former orphanage

The Hohe Warte is a built-up hill in Döbling, the 19th district of Vienna, Austria. The Hohe Warte is best known as the headquarters of GeoSphere Austria (the Federal Institute for Geology, Geophysics, Climatology and Meteorology), the former residence of the president, as well as for the Hohe Warte Stadium.

== Geography ==
The Hohe Warte final extension of the Vienna Woods.

In the 19th century, a villa district was established on the hill. Today, the hill is entirely surrounded by the city.

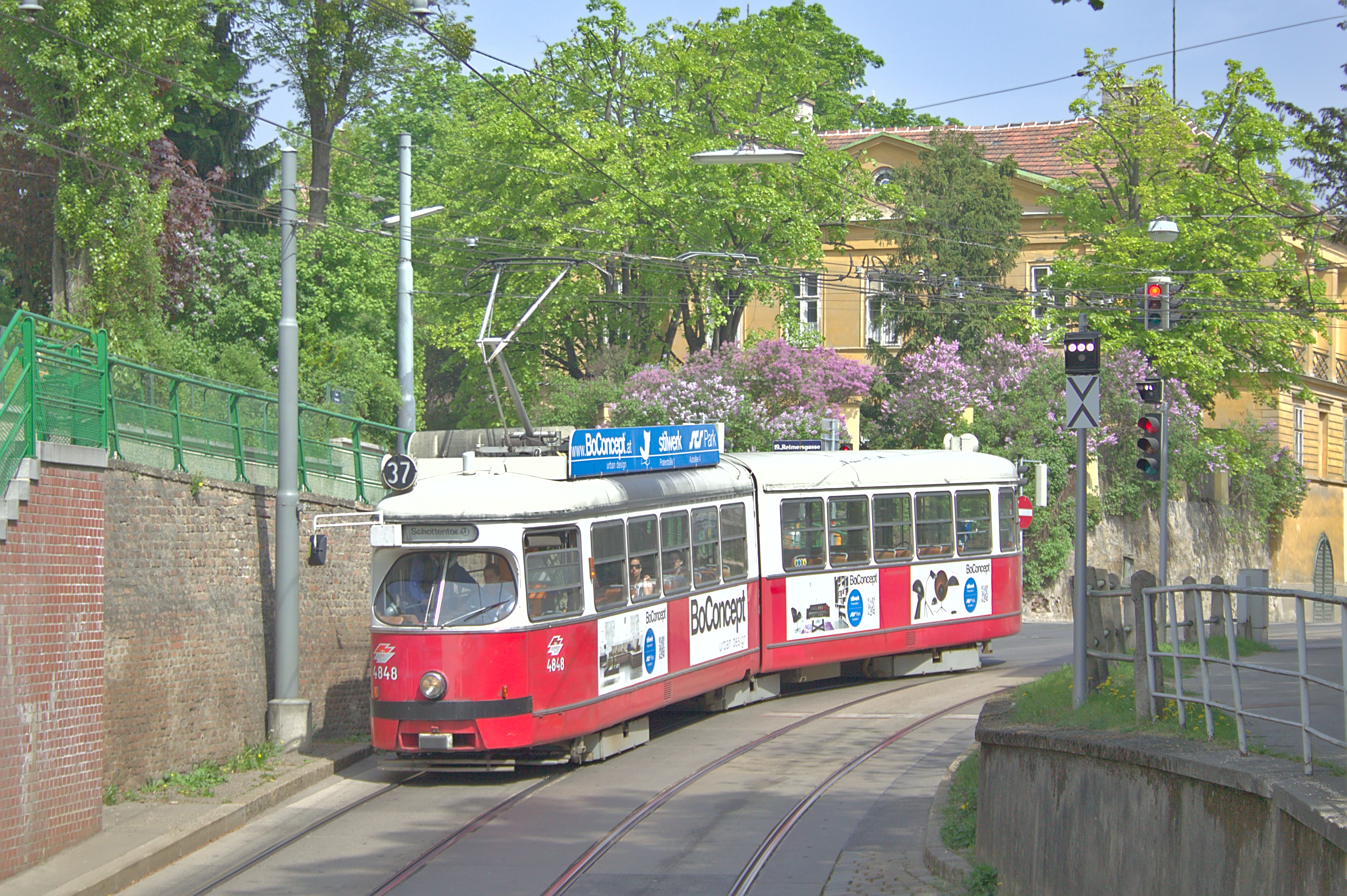
The 37 tram on the Hohe Warte

The Hohe Warte can be reached via the U4 metro line and tram lines 37 and D.

== Headquarters of GeoSphere Austria ==
In 1872, the Central Institute for Meteorology and Geodynamics relocated from Wieden to the Hohe Warte. The new premises were designed by Austrian architect Heinrich von Ferstel and built between 1870 and 1872. The institute is responsible, among other things, for the daily Austrian weather report. In 1957, it was significantly expanded, and in 1967 and 1973, a radar, a weather balloon hanger, and a new office building were added to the institute's grounds. Today, this office building houses a large specialized library in the fields of meteorology and geophysics. When the Central Institute for Meteorology and Geodynamics was merged with the Geological Survey of Austria in 2023, the resulting organization GeoSphere Austria was headquartered at Hohe Warte.

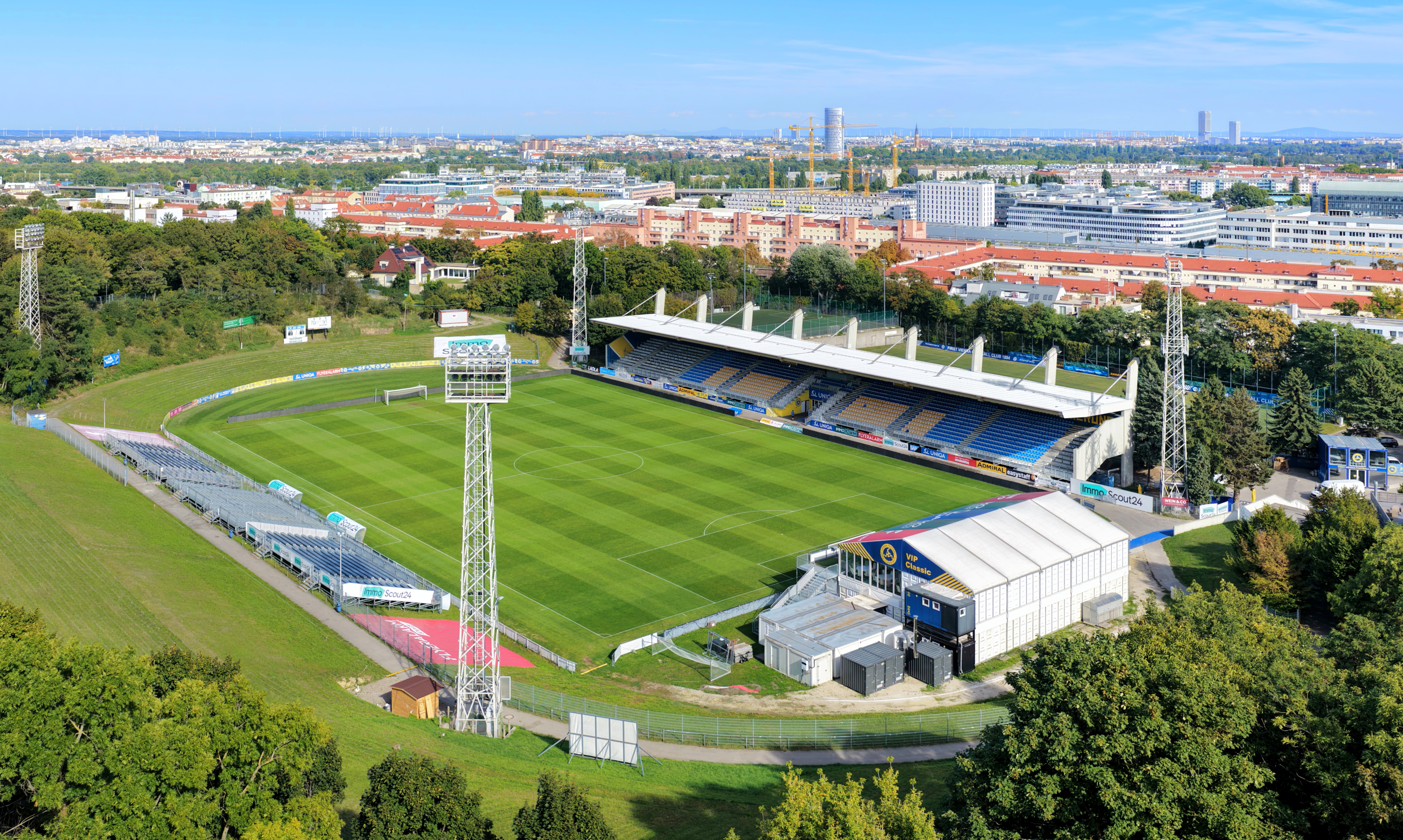
The Hohe Warte Stadium

== Hohe Warte Stadium ==
Hohe Warte Stadium is the home of First Vienna FC, the oldest football club in Austria. Uniquely built into the hillside, it features permanent seating only on the lower side. In the early 20th century, the stadium hosted Austrian national team matches, boxing events, and even operatic performances - including Aida, Pagliacci, and Cavalleria Rusticana - in front of crowds exceeding 80,000. Today, due to safety regulations prohibiting spectators from watching games from the grassy slopes, the stadium's capacity is limited to 4,500.
