= Immigration Restriction League =

1894–1921 American nativist and anti-immigration organization

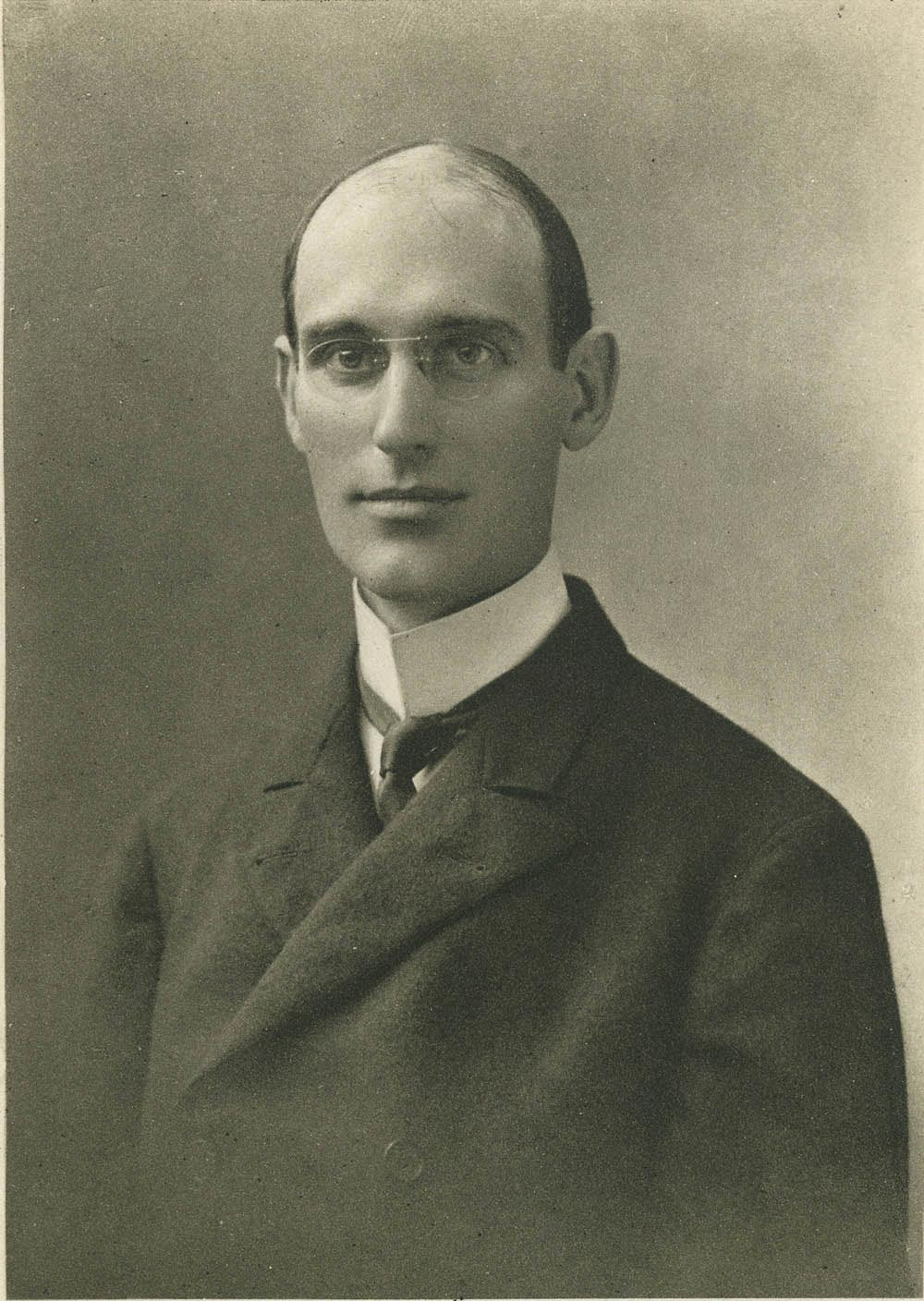
Prescott F. Hall, one of the founders of the Immigration Restriction League

The Immigration Restriction League was an American nativist and anti-immigration organization founded by Charles Warren, Robert DeCourcy Ward, and Prescott F. Hall in 1894. According to Erika Lee, in 1894 the old stock Yankee upper-class founders of the League were "convinced that Anglo-Saxon traditions, peoples, and culture were being drowned in a flood of racially inferior foreigners from Southern and Eastern Europe." Established during a period of increasing anti-immigration sentiment in the United States, the League was founded by Boston Brahmins such as Henry Cabot Lodge with the purpose of preventing immigrants from Eastern Europe and Southern Europe from immigrating to the US due to a belief that they were racially inferior to Northern Europeans and Western Europeans. The League argued that the American way of life was threatened by immigration from these regions, and lobbied Washington to pass anti-immigration legislation restricting the entry of what they perceived as "undesirable" immigrants in order to uphold Old Stock Americans hegemony.

The league was founded in Boston, and soon had branches in New York, Chicago, and San Francisco. It attracted hundreds of prominent scholars and philanthropists and other establishment figures, mostly from the New England social and academic elite. An umbrella group, the National Association of Immigration Restriction Leagues was created in 1896, and one of the founders of the original League, Prescott F. Hall, served as its general secretary from 1896 until his death in 1921.

The League used books, pamphlets, meetings, and numerous newspaper and journal articles to promote their campaign of anti-immigration and eugenics. As the first American anti-immigrant think tank, the League also started to employ lobbyists in Washington after 1900 and built a broad anti-immigrant coalition consisting of patriotic societies, farmers' associations, Southern and New England legislators, and eugenicists who supported the League's goals.

Active in lobbying for the passage of what became the Immigration Act of 1917, the League disbanded after Hall's death in 1921.

== Demands ==
=== Numerical limitation ===
On April 8, 1918, the League introduced a bill into the Congress to increase the restriction of immigration by means of numerical limitation. The goal of this bill, called "An Act to regulate the immigration of aliens to, and the residence in, the United States," was to reduce as much as possible the number of immigrants from Southern and Eastern Europe while increasing the number of immigrants from Northern and Western Europe who the League thought were people with kindred values.

The bill provided for these reductions:

	Actually admitted	Admissible under bill
Northern and Western Europe	189,177	1,090,500
Southern and Eastern Europe	945,288	279,288

=== Increase of the duty on alien passengers ===
The bill asked for an increase of the duty paid by alien passengers to enter the United States from two to five dollars. It excluded the citizens of the United States, Canada, Mexico, and Cuba. The League demanded an increase in duty in order to properly support and maintain the inspection and deportation of immigrants. Among other things, the funds obtained from the increase in duty would be used for:

- Enlargement of immigrant stations
- The development and perfecting of the service along the Mexico–US and Canada–US borders.
- More immigration inspectors
- Enlarged immigration office facilities

With this bill, the League also hoped to diminish the immigration of people from the poorer countries, who were considered less beneficial for the United States.

=== Additions to the excluded classes ===
The National Conference on Immigration, held in New York, proposed to add imbeciles, feeble-minded persons, and epileptics to the excluded classes. Persons of poor physique were more susceptible to diseases because of the unsanitary places where they lived. The Bill also demanded an extension of fines to steamship companies for bringing imbeciles, feeble-minded persons, insane persons or epileptics into the US.

=== Prevention of unlawful landing ===
Previously, transportation companies were only asked to exercise care not to transport illegal immigrants into the United States when returning home from Europe. This bill ordered transportation companies to prevent the landing of "undesirable aliens".

=== Deportation of public charges ===
It was a law that would allow deportation of immigrants who entered the United States in violation of law and those becoming public charges from causes arising prior to their landing. Furthermore, it stated that the company that provided the transportation of such individuals would pay half the cost of their removal to the port of deportation.

=== Literacy test ===
The IRL made common cause with blue collar workers in labor unions in advocating a literacy requirement as a means to limit poorly-educated immigrants who would lower the wage scale. Potential immigrants had to be able to read their own language. Congress passed the literacy bill for the first time in 1896, which set the ability to read at least 40 words in any language as a requirement for admission to the United States. President Grover Cleveland vetoed that bill in 1897.

President William Taft also vetoed a literacy test in 1913. Again in 1915, President Woodrow Wilson vetoed such a bill. But in 1917 Congress overrode Wilson's veto and instituted the first literacy requirement for naturalization as part of the Immigration Act of 1917. The law stated that immigrants over 16 years of age should read 30 to 80 words in ordinary use in any language. The test however proved to be largely irrelevant, as literacy rates by the late 1910s had improved dramatically in southern and Eastern Europe.

== Notable members and officers ==
- George F. Edmunds, founding member
- John Fiske, founding member
- Frank B. Gary
- Madison Grant, vice president
- Prescott Farnsworth Hall, executive secretary
- Henry Holt, publisher
- Joseph Lee, vice president
- Henry Cabot Lodge, senator
- Robert Treat Paine, founding member
- James H. Patten, secretary in Washington, D.C.
- Nathaniel Shaler, founding member
- Francis Amasa Walker, vice president
- Robert DeCourcy Ward, founder
- Owen Wister, novelist

== See also ==
- Immigration reduction
- Opposition to immigration
- Immigration policy
- List of United States immigration legislation
- Dillingham Commission

== Sources ==
=== Primary sources ===
- Robert DeC. Ward: "Open Letters: An Immigration Restriction League", in The Century, v. 49 (1895), 639–40, accessed Jan. 3, 2010
- United States Department of State: The Immigration Act of 1924, accessed Jan. 3, 2010
- Harvard University Library: Constitution of the Immigration Restriction League, accessed Jan. 3, 2010
- Immigration Restriction League. Constitution of the Immigration Restriction league, Boston, Massachusetts: Immigration Restriction League 189–
- Howard B. Grose, Aliens or Americans? New York: Young People's Missionary Movement, c. 1906
- Prescott Farnsworth Hall, Immigration and Its Effects upon the United States New York: Henry Holt & Company, 1906

=== Secondary sources ===
- Barkan, Elliott Robert. And Still They Come: Immigrants and American Society, 1920 to the 1990s (Harlan Davidson, 1996), ISBN 978-0-88295-928-3
- Decker, Julio. "Citizenship and its Duties: The Immigration Restriction League as Progressive Movement", in Immigrants & Minorities, v. 32, 2 (2014), 162–182
- Decker, Julio. "The Transnational Biopolitics of Whiteness and Immigration Restriction in the United States, 1894–1924", in Norbert Finzsch, Ursula Lehmkuhl, Eva Bischoff (eds.): Provincializing the United States: Colonialism, Decolonization and (Post)Colonial Governance in Transnational Perspective, (2014) 121–153 ISBN 9783825363604
- Gratton, Brian. "Race or Politics? Henry Cabot Lodge and the Origins of the Immigration Restriction Movement in the United States." Journal of Policy History 30.1 (2018): 128–157.
- Higham, John. "Origins of immigration restriction, 1882-1897: A social analysis." Mississippi Valley Historical Review 39.1 (1952): 77–88. online
- Higham, John. Strangers in the Land: Patterns of American Nativism, 1860–1925 (Rutgers University Press, 1955) ISBN 978-0-8135-3123-6
- Lee, Erika. America for Americans a history of xenophobia in the United States (2019) excerpt
- McSeveney, Samuel. "Immigrants, the Literacy Test, and Quotas: Selected American History College Textbooks' Coverage of the Congressional Restriction of European Immigration, 1917–1929," in The History Teacher, v. 21 (1987), 41–51
- Solomon, Barbara Miller. Ancestors and Immigrants: A Changing New England Tradition (1956), the standard history of the League
- Tichenor, Daniel J. Dividing Lines: The Politics of Immigration Control in America (2002)
- Vought, Hans P. The Bully Pulpit and the Melting Pot (Mercer University Press, 2004), ISBN 978-0-86554-887-9

External links:

- Harvard College Library: Immigration Restriction League (U.S.) records
- Eugenics Archive: Eugenics Laws Restricting Immigration
