= Victor Conrad =

Austrian-American physicist known for seismology and meteorology

- Born: August 25, 1876; Vienna
- Died: April 25, 1962 (aged 85); Cambridge, Mass.
- Education: University of Vienna
- Scientific career
- Fields: Seismology; Meteorology
- Workplaces: Chernivtsi University; University of Vienna; Harvard University
- Doctoral advisor: Julius von Hann

Victor Conrad (1876-1962) was an Austrian-American physicist, seismologist, and meteorologist. He was the first director of the Austrian seismological service and a reputed academician of international accomplishment. He was politically victimized twice, in 1919 for his ethnicity and in 1934 as a socialist. He emigrated to the United States in 1938, continuing his academic career in New York, California, and Cambridge. Conrad's scientific work is documented in more than 240 papers concerning meteorology, climatology and seismology. In 1944, he published "Methods in Climatology" (Harvard University Press). Later editions, starting in 1950, listed Leo W. Pollak, as second author. He was the first to deduce the continental crust transition structure which is now named the Conrad discontinuity.

== Studies and early seismology work in Vienna ==
Conrad was born on August 25, 1876, in Hütteldorf, Lower Austria (then a suburb and now part of Vienna). His father, an industrialist, was also an amateur painter of landscapes. He was of Jewish descent.

Conrad attended the University of Vienna where he initially studied biology. In 1896, when he started working on his degree Conrad's teacher, the physiologist Sigmund Exner, realized his pupil's talent for experimental work, and encouraged Conrad to take up the study of physics. Following a suggestion of Franz S. Exner he began to work on problems concerning atmospheric electricity and obtained his doctorate in 1900. Conrad became a University assistant at the "K.K. Centralanstalt für Meteorologie und Erdmagnetismus" (the Central Institute for Meteorology and Geodynamics) in 1901, mostly working at the Sonnblick high-altitude observatory for the next three years. In 1904, when the Seismological Service of Austria was established, Conrad was appointed head of the new department and became responsible for the seismic monitoring on Austrian territory. Among his first programs was a microseismic survey in 1905.

== Professor at Czernowitz and Vienna ==
In 1910 Conrad accepted a newly created chair for "cosmic physics" at the University of Czernowitz (now Chernivtsi in Ukraine) which at this time belonged to Austria-Hungary's Bukovina region, and had native German speakers accounting for more than half of its students. From 1916 to 1918, during World War I, he was a director of Meteorological and Astronomical Observatory in Belgrade, Serbia. After the dissolution of the Austro-Hungarian monarchy at the end of World War I the university was rumanized and Conrad was forced to leave Czernowitz at the end of July 1919, losing not only his professorship but also his private assets. He returned to his former position at the Central Meteorological Institute and later as a full professor at Vienna. During his analyses of two earthquakes that occurred in Austria in 1923 and 1927 he discovered what is today known as the Conrad discontinuity, considered to be the border between the upper and the lower continental crust.

== Emigration and further career ==
As a member of Austria's socialist party, Conrad faced political discrimination after the brief and decisive Austrian Civil War. On April 30, 1934, he was put on leave with waiting pay. He retired in 1936, and emigrated to the United States in 1938, with the assistance of German seismologist Beno Gutenberg, where he once again brought his career to bloom. He worked at Pennsylvania State University as assistant professor of Geophysics from 1939 to 1940. After leaving Penn State, he worked at Harvard University beginning in 1940 until his retirement in 1951, New York University from 1940 to 1942, then at California Institute of Technology, and the University of Chicago.

== The Conrad observatory ==
When Victor Conrad died at Cambridge in 1962, his widow Ida bequeathed the majority of the couple's assets to the Austrian Central Institute for Meteorology and Geodynamics, on the condition that the funds be used to establish a research institution bearing her late husband's name. This took place in the form of the Conrad Observatory for Seismology, situated about 50 km from Vienna near Gutenstein. Its module for seismology and gravimetry, became operational in 2002; the final module, for geomagnetic research, was inaugurated in 2014.

== Biographies ==
- Steinhauser H, Toperczer M. "Obituarium: Victor Conrad". Arch. Met. Geophys. Biokl 1962; 13, 283–289.
