= George H. Lyman =

American lawyer and political figure (1850-1945)

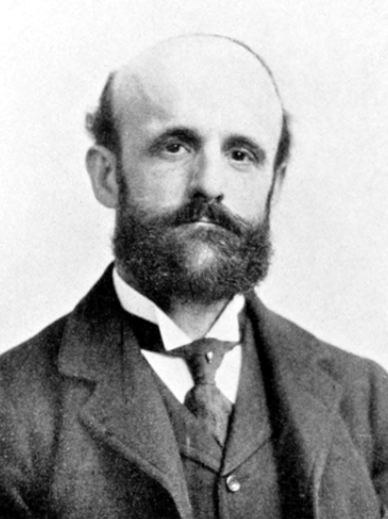
- Born: George Hinckley Lyman Jr; December 13, 1850; Boston, Massachusetts, US
- Died: May 17, 1945 (aged 94); Boston, Massachusetts, US
- Burial place: Mount Auburn Cemetery
- Education: Harvard College; Harvard Law School
- Occupations: Lawyer, politician
- Political party: Republican Party

George Hinckley Lyman Jr. (December 13, 1850 – May 17, 1945) was an American attorney and politician. He was Collector of Customs for the Port of Boston from 1898 to 1919 and served as chairman of the Massachusetts Republican state committee.

== Early life ==
Lyman was born in Boston on December 13, 1850. His father was George H. Lyman, a prominent Boston doctor. His great-grandfather was Elbridge Gerry, a signer of the Declaration of Independence and Vice President of the United States.

Lyman graduated from Boston Latin School and St. Paul's School. He graduated with an A.B. from Harvard College in 1873. After college, he spent a one year of study in Germany. He graduate from Harvard Law School with an LL.B. in 1877, and passed the bar the same years.

== Career ==
Lyman returned to Boston and joined the firm of Ropes, Gray, Boyden & Perkins. He worked as a lawyer for more than sixty years.

Lyman was an active member of the Republican Party in Boston. He served as treasurer of the Ward 11 Republican committee, treasurer of the Boston Republican city committee, a member of the finance committee of the Massachusetts Republican Club, and represented the Fifth Suffolk district on the Republican state committee. From 1893 to 1895, he was chairman of the Massachusetts Republican state committee's finance committee. On January 3, 1895, Lyman was unanimously elected chairman of the Republican state committee. In 1896, he was elected to the Republican National Committee.

On February 17, 1898, Lyman was nominated by President William McKinley for the position of Collector of Customs for the Port of Boston. His nomination was confirmed by the United States Senate five days later. On March 4, he resigned from the Republican National Committee, as he did not want his duties as collector and committeeman to conflict with each other. He took office on April 1. Lyman's administration as collector was described by A. Maurice Low of The Boston Daily Globe as having been "managed in the interest of both the government and the merchants doing business with the customhouse, and that there has been practically no friction."

He was nominated for reappointment as collector of customs by President Theodore Roosevelt on January 8, 1902. In February 1902, The Boston Daily Globe reported that Massachusetts Governor Winthrop M. Crane and others suggested to President Roosevelt that Lyman would be an able successor to United States Secretary of the Navy John Davis Long. Roosevelt and Lyman were friends, and Roosevelt respected Lyman's abilities as a businessman and his record as collector. U.S. Representative William Henry Moody was nominated instead.

On October 17, 1903, United States Assistant Secretary of the Treasury Robert B. Armstrong commenced an investigation into frauds and irregularities at the Boston customhouse. Lyman was not blamed for the irregularities. On April 2, 1906, Lyman was sworn in for an unprecedented third term as collector. He was promised reappointment to a fourth term but chose to retire instead, citing "personal reasons".

In 1918, the director of the Massachusetts Committee on Public Safety Henry Bradford Endicott appointed Lyman to chair a subcommittee of the Public Safety Committee to supervise groups that made public appeals for funds for patriotic purposes. The committee was formed to root out duplication of services, inefficiency, wastefulness, and dishonesty in patriotic societies. It was created soon after an organization known as "The Chain" began soliciting funds in Boston. The Chain's purported treasurer denied any involvement with organization's and Endicott believed its list of patrons was suspect as well. Lyman later wrote a book about the history of the Massachusetts Committee on Public Safety.

In 1927, Lyman was appointed to Boston's Municipal Sinking Funds Commission by Mayor Malcolm Nichols.

== Personal life ==
Lyman was married to Caroline A. Armory. They had a son and two daughters.

Lyman died on May 17, 1945, at his home on Commonwealth Avenue in Boston after a brief illness. He was buried at Mount Auburn Cemetery.

Party political offices
Preceded by Samuel E. Winslow	Chairman of the Massachusetts Republican Party; 1895–1896	Succeeded by Eben Sumner Draper
Preceded by W. Murray Crane	Republican National Committeeman from Massachusetts; 1896–1898	Succeeded by George von Lengerke Meyer
Government offices
Preceded by Winslow Warren	Collector of Customs for the Port of Boston; 1898–1909	Succeeded by Edwin Upton Curtis
