= Dedham Public Library =

Public library system in Massachusetts, US

Coordinates: 42.2478°N 71.1762°W

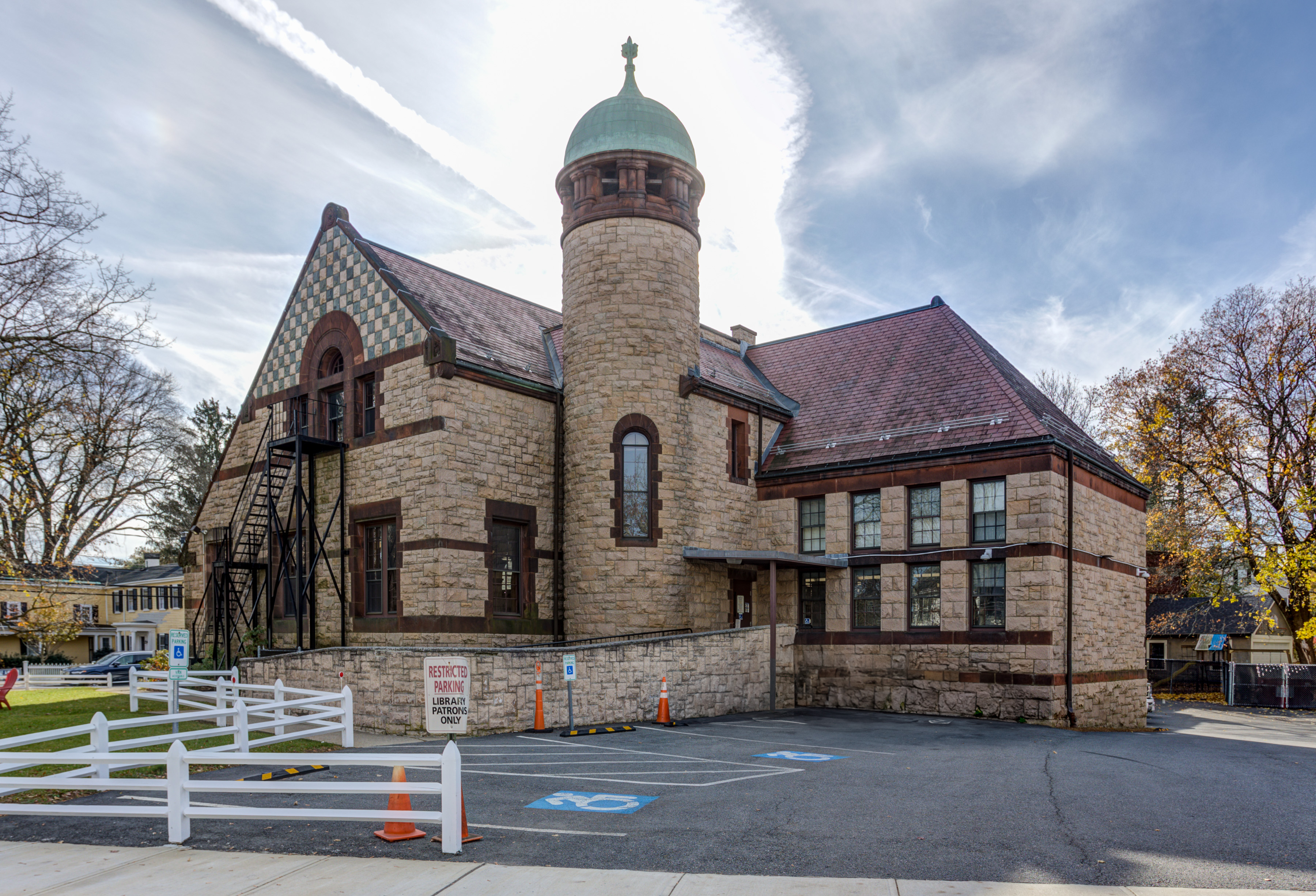
Dedham Public Library

The Dedham Public Library is a public library system in Massachusetts established in 1872. It is part of the Minuteman Library Network.

== History ==
=== Social library ===
In 1794, just four years after the first circulating library was established in Massachusetts, the First Church and Parish in Dedham organized a social library. The minister, Jason Haven, kept the books in his house (Note: Haven's house stood where the Allin Congregational Church stands today.) and they were only circulated on Mondays. The books were eventually moved to the vestry of the church, and circulation was moved to Sundays.

=== Bussey Social and Circulating Library ===
In 1837, Benjamin Bussey underwrote part of the cost of a library above Boyden's Store, which was also the mill store, for the benefit of the residents of Mill Village. It was known as the Bussey Social and Circulating Library and was only open to paying members. It failed after a few years for lack of support.

=== Dedham Library Association ===
On the November 24, 1854, a social library was organized in Dedham under the general laws by the name of the Dedham Library Association. The impetus for the founding the Library Association was Carlos Slafter, who made the first suggestion, and Dr. Joseph P. Paine. The pair raised $1,300. A circulating library belonging to Elbridge G. Robinson, editor of the Norfolk Democrat, was purchased for about $200. In addition to these, many new books were bought at an expense of about $1,000.

Three gentlemen, Edmund Quincy, Edward L. Keyes, and M.B. Inches, became actively interested in the project and contributed much to its success. The library was opened to the public on February 1, 1855, in a house next to the insurance building where Judge Ezra Wilkinson formerly had an office. Dr. Samuel Adams, a dentist, was the first librarian and lived in the same building. By the payment of $5, a person became a shareholder and member of the Association and was obliged to pay a varying sum annually toward its support. After a time, persons not members were admitted on payment of a fixed sum annually. The directors were able, at a moderate cost, to furnish the patrons with the best reading matter to be secured. The interest in the library as well as the number of readers increased from year to year and its influence upon the social and intellectual improvement of the town was marked.

=== Incorporation as a public library ===
For some time previous to 1870, a strong desire had been felt by many members of the association and others interested in the usefulness of the library that free privileges should be granted to the people of the town. This was found not to be feasible owing to insufficient funds. There was such a demand for this change that an effort was made to raise money for the support of a public library. A successful fair was held by the ladies of the Association soon after this in which people of all parts of the town were actively interested and which resulted in raising $4,000 as a fund for the new library.

Several persons had petitioned the Massachusetts General Court for an act of incorporation, which was passed March 24, 1871 and accepted April 27, 1871. This act incorporated Waldo Colburn, Thomas L. Wakefield, Edward Stimson, Edmund Quincy, William Chickering, Erastus Worthington, Alfred Hewins, Henry 0. Hildreth, and their associates and successors by the name of the Dedham Public Library and Reading Room. It also gave them power to hold in trust real and personal estate in value not exceeding $100,000 exclusive of books, papers, and works of art. The act stated that so long as said corporation shall allow the inhabitants of Dedham free access to its library and reading room under reasonable regulations, the town may annually appropriate and pay said corporation a sum not exceeding one dollar on each of its ratable polls.

At a meeting of the trustees held in November, it was voted to open a free public library and reading room at the earliest practicable date. The Dedham Library Association was deeply interested in this movement and, at a special meeting held on November 17, unanimously voted to transfer the entire property of the association to the public library to remain in the care control and custody of the said Dedham Public Library so long as the same shall be kept and maintained as a free library for the use of the proprietors of this library wherever resident as well as for the inhabitants of Dedham. An additional condition was that the public library must assume and pay all the debts and liabilities of the Library Association. This gift amounted to 2,977 volumes and formed the nucleus of the new library.

=== First reading room ===
On February 24, 1872, the library and reading room were opened to the public in rooms hired for the purpose in a building on the corner of High and Court streets above Thomas J. Baker's grocery store.

There were 3,557 volumes on the shelves and some of the principal periodicals and newspapers on the tables. From year to year, the town appropriated on an average about $1,000. Of this sum, about $700 represented the dog tax. The running expenses of the library were paid from the town appropriation and books and periodicals were bought from the annual income of the funds which amounted to about $550. The average yearly increase was about 235 volumes.

=== First building ===
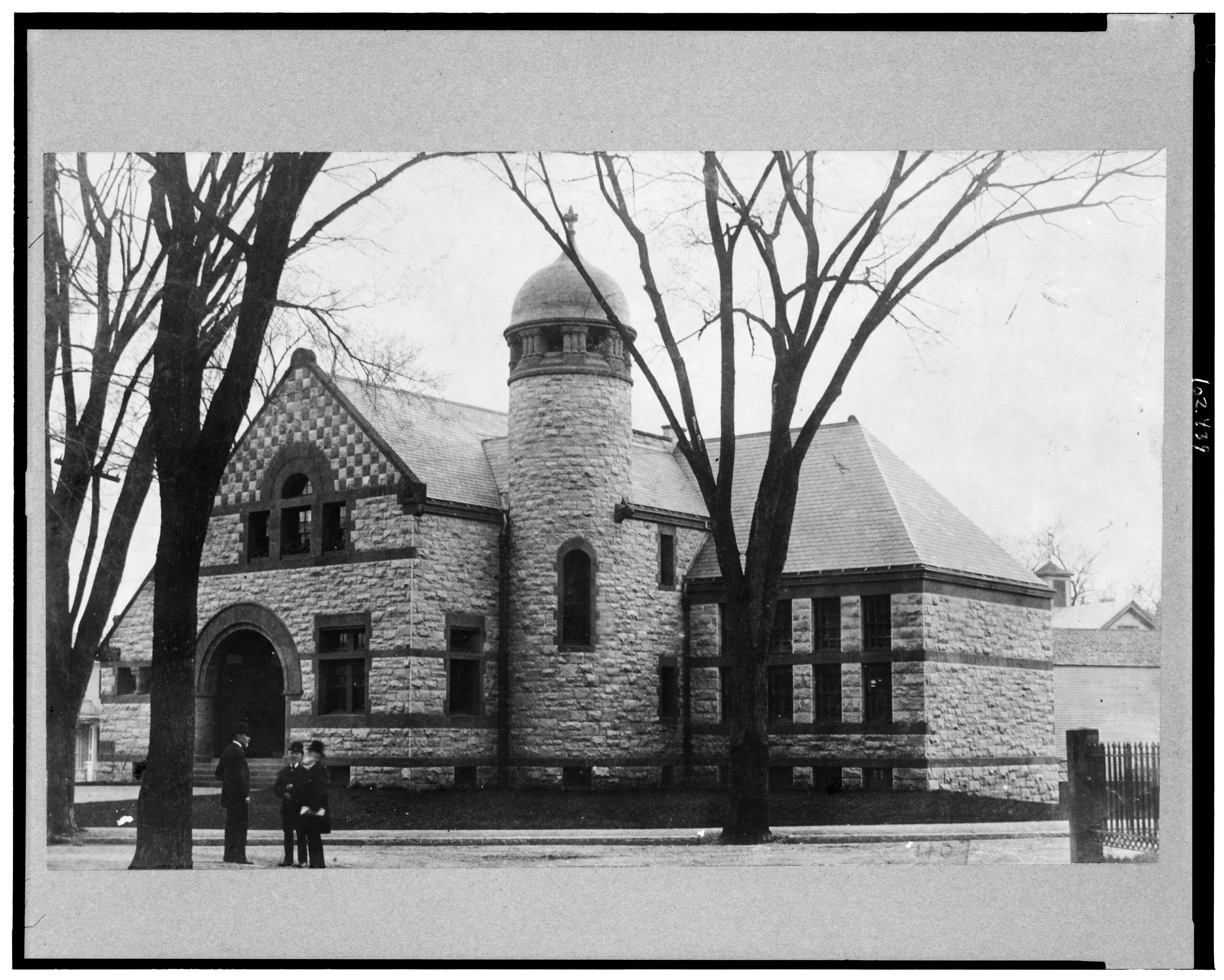
Exterior of the library, showing the original entrance on Norfolk Street, in 1890

Soon after the death of Hannah Shuttleworth on February 22, 1886, the first steps were taken to erect a new library building. This was made possible by her legacy of $10,000 and a gift of the same amount from John Bullard. In April 1886, a lot of 19,101 square feet in size was purchased for $2,000 on the corner of Church and Norfolk Streets; the ground was broken on October 13. Previously, the lot was home to a large white house and an orchard. (Note: The house was the home to a number of families, including that of Joseph Carrett and his daughters, Theresa, Eliza, and Josephine, and later of Dr. Paine, the genial homeopathic physician who left Dedham and moved to Roxbury.)

At a meeting of the trustees held September 22, it was voted to add $4,000 from the general fund to the Bullard and Shuttleworth legacies which were given specially for a building fund. This amount was increased by the accumulation of the funds. The final cost of the building was as follows: cost of land, $4,975.14, grading and fencing, $587.44, building and furniture, $29,873.17, total, $35,385.75.

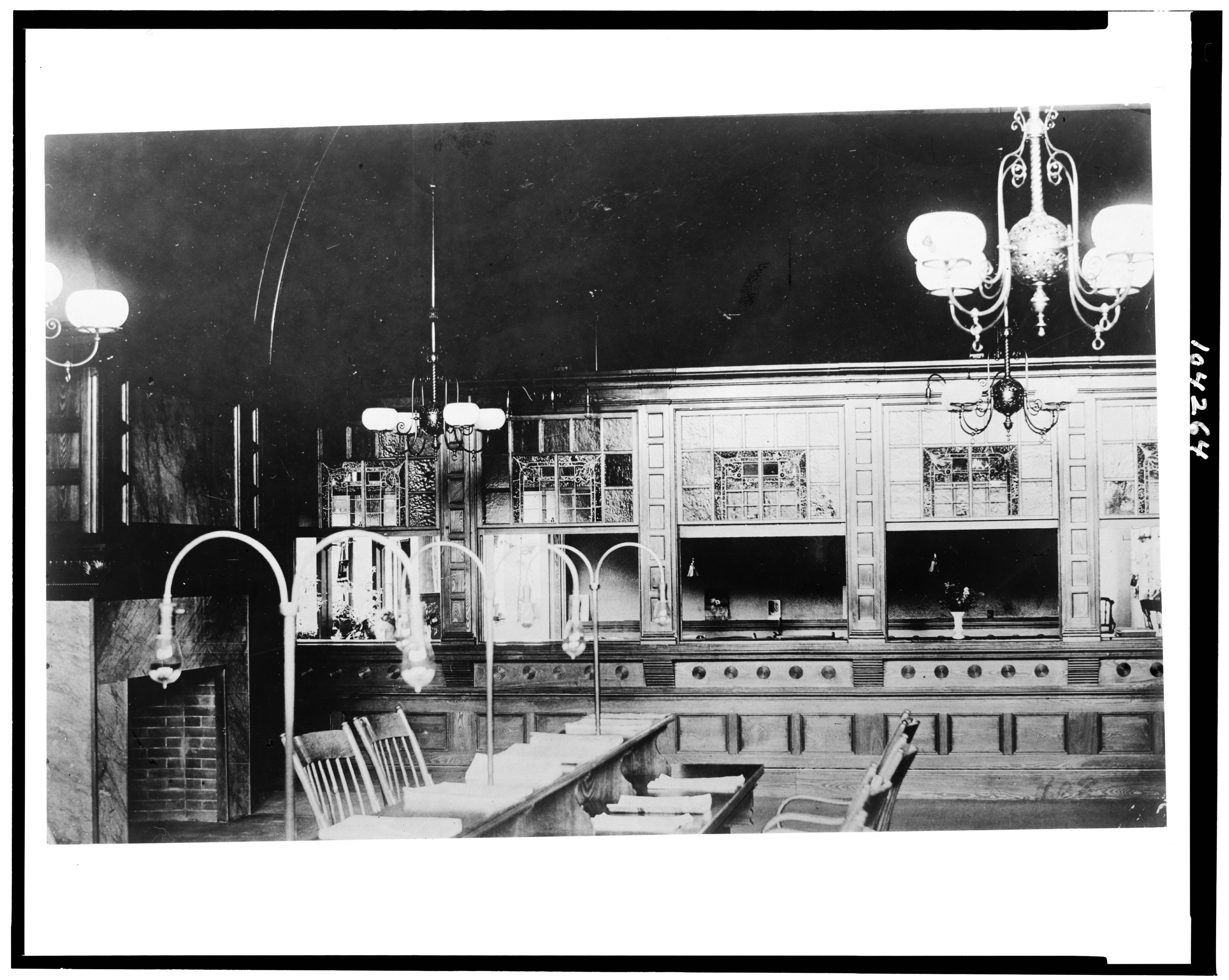
Reading room with ornate counter or delivery desk, in 1905

This building was constructed in the French Romanesque / Richardsonian Romanesque style of Dedham pink granite laid up with random ashlar work in quarry facings and trimmings of red sandstone. The main entrance was by a wide arch opening on a porch from which through a vestibule access is obtained to a square entrance hall. From this hall, a wide arch opens opposite the porch into the reading hall and another on the right into the delivery room.

Back of the delivery room and at the right of the reading hall from which it was divided by a glass screen partition was the librarian's room, so placed as to give the librarian control of the public area of the building. The wing of the building was constructed as a fire proof book stack, the shelving of which accommodated 28,800 volumes. The first ever use of a metal stack system was probably Van Brunt design of the Statehouse Library in Topeka, Kansas in 1883. Dedham's was designed three years later.

Between the delivery room and the book stack was a round tower which gave access to a large room directly over the porch, used by the trustees. The reading hall was an open timbered room twenty one feet high with arched trusses and an apsidal end and a frieze of high windows. Opposite the main entrance into this room was an open hooded fireplace, above which was a marble plane for an inscription. This design was typical of Van Brunt's libraries, which often had a sequence of public rooms integrating the entry, book delivery, and reading rooms. The stacks were perpendicular to the main building.

The woodwork of the interior of the building was brown ash and the plaster surfaces were treated with color and border lines. The interior of the stack was painted white. The system of heating was by indirect radiation in the main portion of the building and by direct radiation in the book stack. The building was opened to the public on November 22, 1888.

A children's room was established in 1916. When the Dedham station was demolished in 1951, the stones were used to build an addition to the library. This became the children's wing, which opened in 1952. With the addition, the main entrance moved from Norfolk Street to Church Street.

For the 100th anniversary in 1972, the Library hosted a number of lectures and readings, including those by Howard Mumford Jones, William Alfred, and Anne Sexton. There were also a number of children's programs, a presentation on floral arraignments, and a presentation on Dedham Pottery. The Centennial closed with the opening of the Endicott Branch.

=== Work with the schools ===
The annual circulation of the library was about 28,000 volumes in 1899, nearly one third of which went through the delivery stations in the upper grades of the grammar schools in charge of the teachers. This effort to connect the library more intimately with the work of the Dedham Public Schools widened its service and made it a stronger factor in the education of the children. This system helped to fill a need long felt of some intelligent oversight of the reading by young people.

Through the interest of the superintendent of schools, Roderick W. Hine, the whole plan has been developed and successfully carried out. A list of books was prepared by the superintendent and a committee of the teachers and typewritten copies having the shelf numbers were placed in the various schools. A special library card was printed for the use of scholars in drawing books, the cards were sent to the library. The books were then sent to the school in a basket at little or no expense. The books were then distributed and kept in the homes during the specified time and returned to the library in the same basket. With this improvement in the circulation of books sprang up a new interest in a better selection of reading for the young.

=== Early gifts ===
Charles Bullard, from whom the first bequest came, changed the provision in his will just before his death on July 29, 1871, so that the public library should receive $3,000 in the place of $2,000 for the Library Association. Only the income of this was to be used for the purchase of books.

Among the special gifts to this collection may be mentioned the following: Henry 0. Hildreth gave several hundred volumes at different times. Ebenezer Wright gave a bequest of 170 volumes relating mostly to agriculture and horticulture. Dr. George E. Hatton made a bequest of 154 volumes and some pamphlets. In 1880, William Ames gave 416 volumes. Dr. Henry P. Quincy in 1886 gave 342 volumes. John Bullard donated an Encyclopædia Britannica. Many other important gifts were made by persons interested in the library and the whole number added to the generous donation of the Dedham Library Association to the end of 1888 amounted to about 3,000 volumes. Gifts in money were received as follows: from the ladies fair $4,000, bequest of Charles Bullard in 1871, $3,000, from Joseph W. Clark in 1872, $411, bequest of Dr. Danforth P. Wright in 1874, $1,000, bequest of Dr. George Hatton in 1876, $1,000, legacy of John Bullard of New York in 1882, $10,000. In early years the library also received the following gifts: Albert W. Nickerson, $5,000, Joseph W. Clark, $1,000, George A. Nickerson, $1,000, Stephen M. Weld, $500, Henry P. Quincy $200, A. Ward Lamson, (Note: Son of Alvan Lamson.) $100, and John R. Bullard, $469.49.

== Statistics ==
Year	Volumes	Circulation	Visits	Notes
1807	87			
1860	500			
1898	14,978	27,868		
1908	26,094	35,094		
2018		194,006	250,000+	

== Branches ==
=== Book deposits ===
There were book deposits at the Capen and Riverdale Schools in the 1900s. They were phased out in 1970, and their collections were given to the Dedham Public Schools.

=== East Dedham branch ===
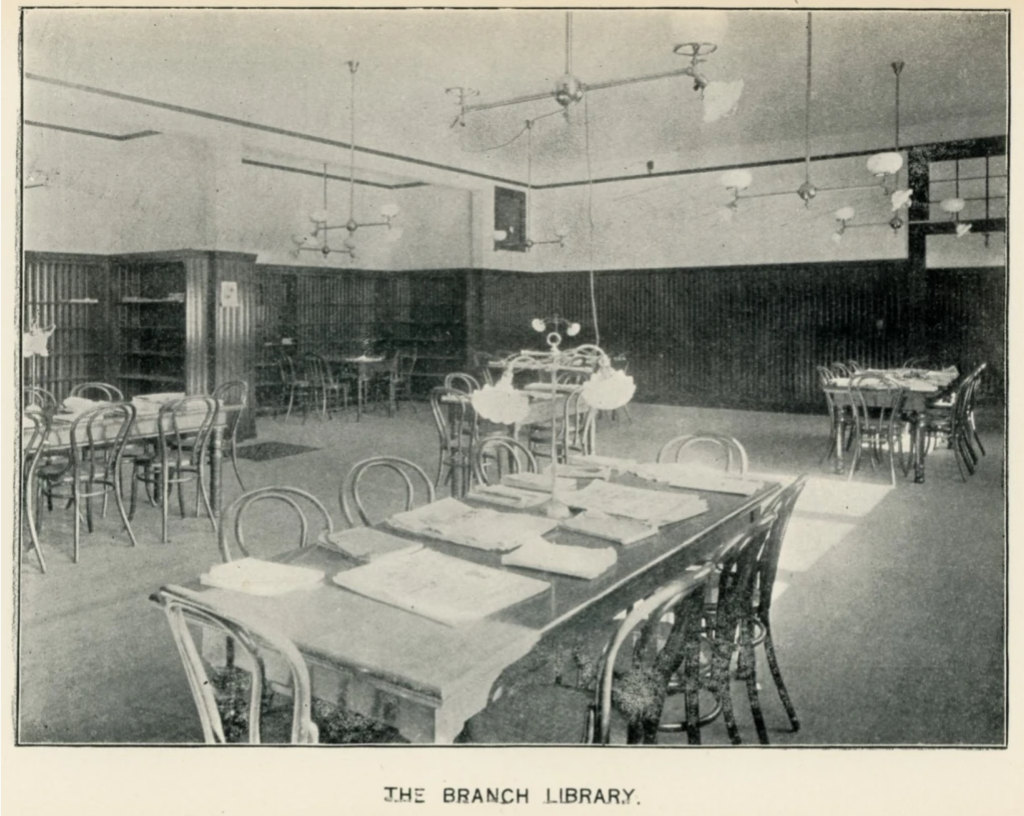
East Dedham branch when it opened

On January 30, 1896, the Library opened a reading room in East Dedham at 23 Milton Street. Royal O. Storrs, who owned the mills in the neighborhood, was a Library Trustee and largely responsible for opening the branch.

The success of the reading room in East Dedham prompted the trustees to establish a full circulating branch in the neighborhood, complete with a reference section. It opened on April 12, 1907 and closed on January 26, 1973 when it was consolidated with the Oakdale branch to become the Endicott branch.

=== Oakdale branch ===
A reading room and circulating library in Oakdale Square opened on November 6, 1903. It closed on April 15, 1972, when it was combined with the East Dedham branch to become the Endicott branch.

=== Endicott branch ===
By 1970, the rented spaces in Oakdale and East Dedham were in "deplorable" condition and, because they were leased to the Town, they could not be expanded. Though they each cost $16,000 to operate, they were not adequately serving the public and were described as "money down the drain." Problems at the main library included a lack of parking, not enough room for books, and the need to improve services. There were recent renovations that created more space for books in the basement at the main library, but it still was not enough.

At the October 1969 Town Meeting, a seven member committee was formed to study the future needs of the library. They made their final report in January 1971.

In October 1970, the Dedham Library Future Needs Committee (Note: Chairman Thomas E. Riley made the presentation.) made two proposals to a joint meeting of the Library Trustees and the Finance Committee. The first was to combine the Oakdale and East Dedham branch libraries and move them to a renovated garage at the Endicott Estate. The second proposal was to build a new building on the East Street side of the Estate grounds to house the combined branch libraries and to make the main library on Church Street a branch.

It was noted that the Endicott Estate had room for adequate parking, and was close to Dedham High School, Dedham Junior High School, the Avery, Capen, Greenlodge, and Oakdale Schools, as well as St. Mary's School. Its central location also made it accessible to many pedestrians without having to cross a major road.

The Finance Committee's recommendation to Town Meeting was to appropriate $61,000 to convert the nine car garage into a library. They also recommended that Town Meeting not adopt a competing article from the Youth Commission that would have turned the garage into a youth center at a cost of $16,000. (Note: The Finance Committee did recommend, however, that the Recreation Department open a teen center and that a director be hired for it.) The Finance Committee argued that it was a prudent move to consolidate the other branches, and that a library would serve all age groups within the town. Neighbors of the Estate also objected to a teen center, but supported a library.

Town Meeting debated the competing proposals for more than three hours, and ultimately rejected both in 1971. Though they had initially supported it, at Town Meeting the Finance Committee changed their recommendation from supporting the proposal to recommending indefinite postponement. As a result, the garage continued to be used for storage.

At the 1972 Annual Town Meeting, the Library Trustees made a new pitch for two of the Estate's 26 acres, including the garage. This time, Town Meeting appropriated $68,000 to convert the garage to a branch library. The final cost was $71,000.

The Planning Board rejected the Library Trustee's first proposal for a parking plan when Marie-Louise Kehoe changed her vote. The vote delayed the awarding of the contract for the renovation of the garage into a library. Eight firms had bid on the work.

Construction began on October 11, 1972. The contract required construction to be complete within 120 days. The architect was Finegold and Bullis. It was designed to hold up to 15,000 books, more than could be held at the Oakdale and East Dedham branches combined.

Trustee chairman Sophia S. Johnson cut a ceremonial ribbon to open the library on February 11, 1973. A crowd of 2,000 people lined up outside in frigid weather to visit during the subsequent open house. The Story Pit in what used to be the garage's old boiler room was particularly popular. The walls were painted with reds and yellows, and the bookshelves were blue.

A group of Campfire Girls provided refreshments and a clarinet quartet from the High School played music. The Botany Club at the Junior High School provided plants. Among the first visitors was Maryanne Lewis.

== Governance ==
Library Director	Years	Notes
Dr. Samuel Adams	1855-1856	
Elizabeth R. Nicholson	1856-1860	
Elizabeth Skillin	1860-1871	
Frances M. Mann	1871- (Note: Mann served to at least 1899.)	
Robert C. Woodward	1955-1962	
Mary Ann Tricarico	2012-February 12, 2016	
Bonnie Roalsen	August 2016-April 2019	
Ryan Brennan	2019 - March 2020	
Amber Moroney	2021 - 2025	(Note: Moroney had previously been serving as interim director.)
Tom O'Connell	July 21, 2025 – present	

On April 1, 1889, by act of the General Court, the trustees transferred the entire property of the library to the town. On the same date the town voted to accept the gift of the franchise library and property, real and personal, of the Dedham Public Library upon the condition that the town would forever maintain the same as a free public library. At that time, nine trustees were elected by ballot: three for three years, three for two years, and three for one year.

Previous to the transfer, the same system was in operation but the town had no representation on the board. The presidents of the Library Association were John Gardner one year, Edmund Quincy five years, Carlos Slafter nine years, John Cox, Jr. three years, Carlos Slafter one year during which time the gift was made to the public library in 1871.

From 1871 to 1889 the officers were Alfred Hewins, president, Henry 0. Hildreth, clerk, and Henry W. Richards, treasurer. When John R. Bullard declined reelection in April 1898, Hon. Winslow Warren was elected as chairman of the board.

In 2020, all five trustees resigned from their positions, saying they did not feel supported by the Town.

== Works cited ==
- Clarke, Wm. Horatio (1903). Mid-Century Memories of Dedham. Dedham Historical Society.
- Hanson, Robert Brand (1976). Dedham, Massachusetts, 1635-1890. Dedham Historical Society.
- Dedham Historical Society (2001). Images of America: Dedham. Arcadia Publishing. ISBN 978-0-7385-0944-0.
- Massachusetts Board of Library Commissioners (1899). Report of the Free Public Library Commission of Massachusetts.
- Neiswander, Judith (2024). Mother Brook and the Mills of East Dedham. Damianos Publishing. ISBN 978-1-941573-66-2.
- Smith, Frank (1936). A History of Dedham, Massachusetts. Transcript Press, Incorporated.
- Free Public Library Commission of Massachusetts (1908). Report of the Free Public Library Commission of Massachusetts. Secretary of the Commonwealth.
