= Swiss Meteorological Society =

Swiss Society for Meteorology
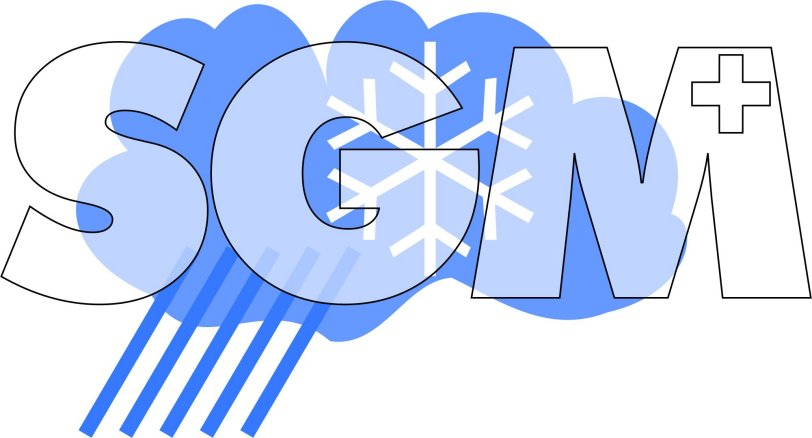
- Abbreviation: SGM/SSM
- Formation: 1916; 110 years ago
- Type: Scientific
- Location: Switzerland
- Website: https://sgm-meteo.ch

The Swiss Society for Meteorology (Schweizerische Gesellschaft für Meteorologie - SGM) is a union of professional meteorologists and weather enthusiasts in Switzerland.

== Overview ==
The society aims at:

- promoting the sciences about the atmosphere and hydrosphere, in particular aeronomy, glaciology, oceanography, climatology, meteorology and atmospheric physics and chemistry; included also is the application of all these disciplines to other planets.
- supporting especially young researchers, by offering a platform for exchange about progress in the atmospheric sciences. Furthermore, the annual meeting of the society favours the build-up of a network of Swiss and other researchers.
- establishing and keeping the contact to other national and international scientific societies; of particular importance is the contact to the Swiss Academy of Natural Sciences (SCNAT), where the SGM is member of the Geoscience group. Further, the SGM is part of the Swiss national committee of the International Union of Geodesy and Geophysics (IUGG) and is also part of the European Meteorological Society (EMS) since 1999, the founding year of the EMS.

Together with the German and Austrian Society of Meteorology (DMG and ÖGM, respectively), the SGM is co-publisher of the peer-reviewed journal Meteorologische Zeitschrift and is co-organiser of the international DACH-MT conference, which takes place every three years. Further, the SGM supports other scientific conferences.

== History ==
The SGM was founded on 8 August 1916 in Scuol / Schuls as Swiss Society for Geophysics, Meteorology and Astronomy (GMA), and it was then part of the Swiss Society of Natural Sciences (SNG). The constituting assembly took place on 28 April 1917 in Bern. The name of the Society was finally changed to Swiss Society for Meteorology (SSM/SGM) on 7 October 1994, after a separate Society for Astronomy and Astrophysics and for Geophysics was established.

== Literature ==
- Saskia Willemse, Markus Furger (eds.): From weather observations to atmospheric and climate sciences in Switzerland. Celebrating 100 years of the Swiss Society for Meteorology, vdf Hochschulverlag Zürch, 2016, ISBN 978-3-7281-3745-6.
