= Hannah Shuttleworth =

American philanthropist (1800–1886)

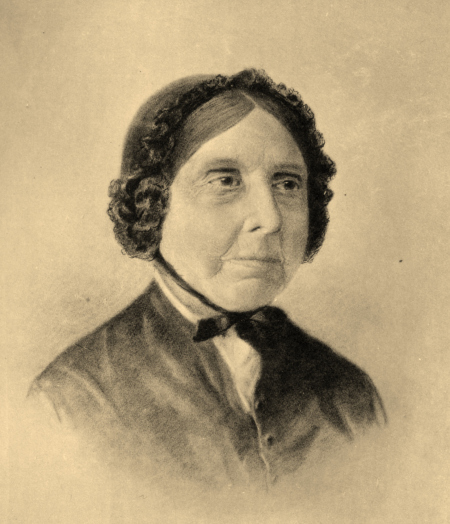
Hannah Shuttleworth

Hannah Shuttleworth (1800–1886) was a philanthropist from Dedham, Massachusetts.

== Personal life ==
Shuttleworth was born in 1800 to Jeremiah Shuttleworth, the brother-in-law of Nathaniel Ames, and his wife, Susanna (née Richards) Shuttleworth. She had brothers, Sam and Jerry.

Jeremiah was Dedham's first postmaster with the post office housed in their family home, located at the corner of Church and High Streets. For many years, notices—everything from the death of Abraham Lincoln to the announcement of a baseball game—were tacked to a buttonwood tree in front of the house. (Note: It eventually was toppled during Hurricane Gloria in 1985.)

At the age of 16, Shuttleworth moved in with Ames. When Ames died in 1822, he left his fortune to his wife and, upon her death, to the unmarried Hannah, his closest living relative. She immediately sold her inheritance for $2,300 and deposited the proceeds with the Massachusetts Hospital Life Insurance Company. When she died, her executor received $40,000.

Shutleowrth was "about as shy and retiring as they get." She rarely left her house, but did receive visitors. From her time with Ames and from his inheritance, she became an expert in Dedham's history.

== Shuttleworth's will ==
Shuttleworth left $500 each to of her help.

=== Dedham Historical Society ===
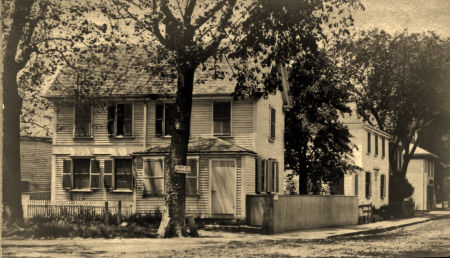
The Shuttleworth house

In her will, Shuttleworth left her family home and $10,000 to the Dedham Historical Society. In 1886, the 250th anniversary of the founding of the town, Don Gleason Hill announced the gift at the Society's annual meeting in March. The family home, which was on the corner of Church and High Streets, was sold and moved to Bryant Street, but was torn down in the 1970s. The Society constructed a new building on the site to house their museum and archive. The fireproof, colonial style building consisted of a lecture-display hall, basement storage area, and office space. It was described at the time as "one of the finest architectural buildings in the shire town of Norfolk."

=== Dedham Public Library ===
She also left $10,000 in her will to the Dedham Public Library. In April 1886, a lot of 19,101 square feet in size was purchased for $2,000 using her bequest on the corner of Church and Norfolk Streets; ground was broken to construct the library on October 13.

=== Shuttleworth Fund ===
A third bequest in Shuttleworth's will was for $32,000 to the Town of Dedham to set up a fund to provide assistance to the "worthy poor" of the town. It largely sat in a bank account collecting interest from the time of her death in 1886 to the Great Recession in 2009. By that time, the balance had grown to $230,000. The terms of the will said it could be expended by the Overseers of the Poor, a body which existed when Shuttleworth died but which was abolished in the 1970s. Town Meeting then asked the Great and General Court to declare the Board of Selectmen as the Overseers of the Poor, and the Board then appointed a Shuttleworth Committee. The Committee then began giving grants of up to $500 to help people pay utility bills, for medication, or other needs.

== Legacy ==
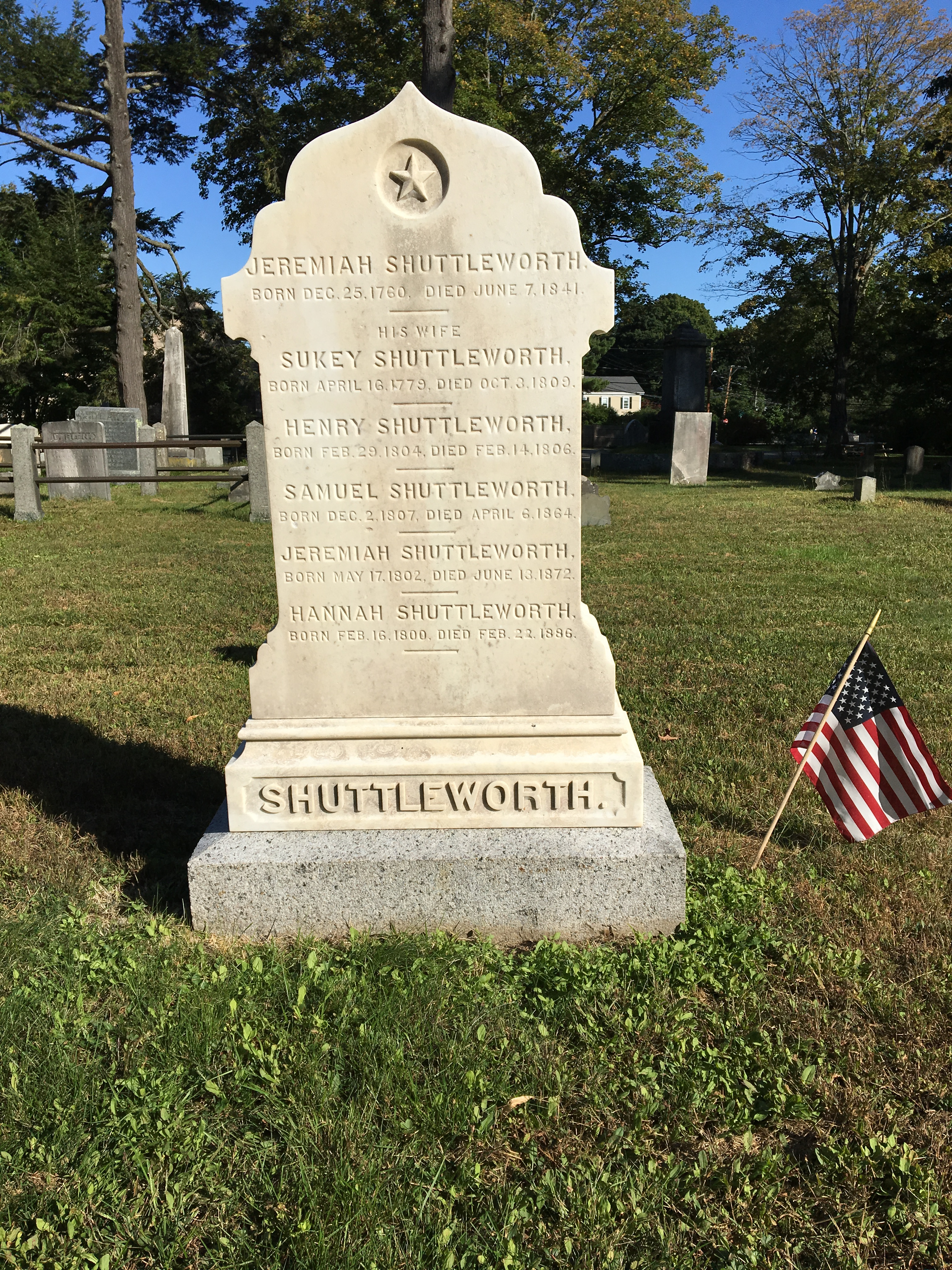
Shuttleworth grave

Hill wanted to honor Shuttleworth by hanging a portrait of her in the hall of the Historical Society's new building, but it was determined that no photograph or portrait had ever been taken of her. Hill then devised a plan to obtain her likeness that was "literally snatched from the grave." As he wrote in Dedham Records, published in 1888

“The morning following her funeral, a cold blustering February day, Gariboldi, the statuary manufacturer, was summoned from Boston, and inside the receiving tomb a plaster cast of her face was taken, and from this alone, with the descriptions which a few friends who knew her best could furnish, Miss Annie R. Slafter, of Dedham, made the crayon portrait which now hangs in the place of honor over the great mantel in our Historical Society room.”

The death mask, drawing, and Shuttleworth's bonnet are now all in the collection of the Historical Society.

When Hill, who was also the Town Clerk, published the early records of the Town in 1888, he dedicated the collection to Shuttleworth. "Her munificent bequeaths," the dedication said, "to our Historical Society and public library, and also to the Town of a large permanent fund to aid the worthy poor, will make her a name a household word. Generations to come will speak her praise."

Shuttleworth Place in Dedham is named in her honor.

== Works cited ==
- Dedham Historical Society (2001). Images of America: Dedham. Arcadia Publishing. ISBN 978-0-7385-0944-0.
- Smith, Frank (1936). A History of Dedham, Massachusetts. Transcript Press, Incorporated.
- Massachusetts Board of Library Commissioners (1899). Report of the Free Public Library Commission of Massachusetts.
- Parr, James L. (2009). Dedham: Historic and Heroic Tales From Shiretown. The History Press. ISBN 978-1-59629-750-0.
- Clarke, Wm. Horatio (1903). Mid-Century Memories of Dedham. Dedham Transcript press.
