= Prescott F. Hall =

American lawyer (1868–1921)

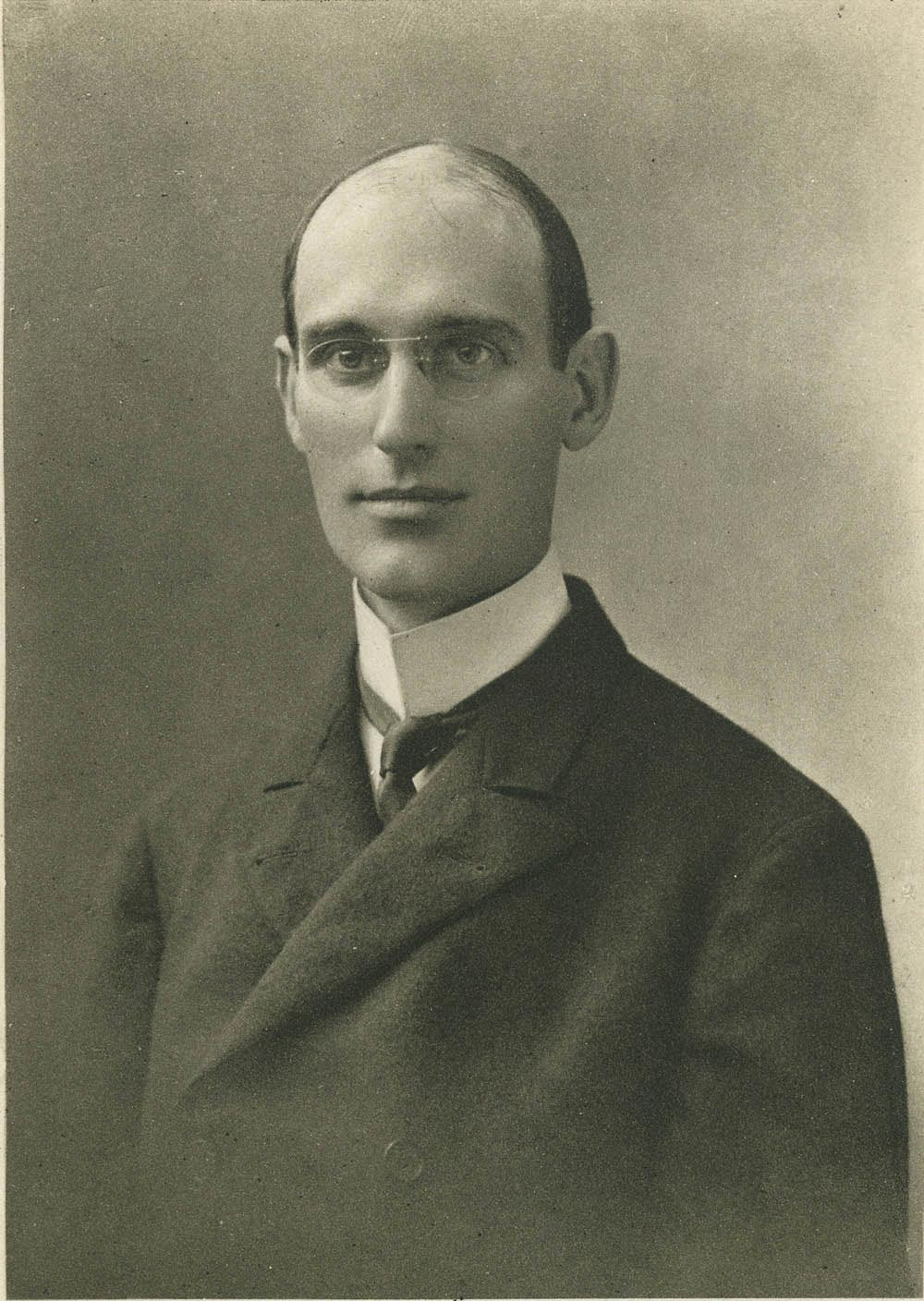
- Born: Prescott Farnsworth Hall; September 27, 1868; Boston, Massachusetts, United States
- Died: May 28, 1921 (aged 52); Brookline, Massachusetts
- Education: Harvard University
- Occupations: Lawyer, writer
- Spouse: Eva Lucyle Irby
- Parent(s): Samuel Farnsworth Hall, Mary Elisabeth Hall

Prescott Farnsworth Hall (27 September 1868 – 28 May 1921) was an American lawyer and author who championed nativism, eugenics and anti-immigration views.

== Career ==
After preparation at G. W. Noble's School in Boston he entered Harvard, graduating from the college in 1889 and from the Law School in 1892. In May 1894, he became one of the founders and first secretary of the Immigration Restriction League, today considered the first anti-immigrant think tank in the United States. He was also a member of the American Society for Psychical Research, the Bostonian Society and the American Genetic Association.

An advocate of scientific racism and eugenics, he is known today primarily for his role in lobbying for the passage of what became the Immigration Act of 1917, which created a federal framework for restricting immigration—by imposing a literacy test, levying an $8 charge on every immigrant, and creating a massive exclusion zone with the Asiatic Barred Zone.

== Works ==
- Immigration and its Effects upon the United States, Henry Holt and Company, 1906.
  - "The Ethical Aspects of Regulation." In Albert B. Wolfe, ed., Readings in Social Problems, Ginn & Company, 1916.
  - "History of Immigration." In Philip Davis, ed., Immigration and Americanization, Ginn & Company, 1920.
- The Massachusetts Business Corporation Law of 1903, William J. Nagel, 1908.
- Immigration and Other Interests of Prescott Farnsworth Hall, with a foreword by Madison Grant, The Knickerbocker Press, 1922.

=== Articles ===
- "Present Status of Immigration Restriction," Gunton's Magazine, Vol. XXVII, 1891.
- "Voluntary Assignments and Insolvency in Massachusetts," Harvard Law Review, Vol. 8, No. 5, Dec. 26, 1894.
- "Italian Immigration," The North American Review, August 1896.
- "Immigration and the Educational Test," The North American Review, October 1897.
- "The Federal Contract Labor Law," Harvard Law Review, Vol. 11, No. 8, Mar. 25, 1898.
- "Statistics of Immigration," Publications of the American Statistical Association, Vol. 6, No. 48, Dec., 1899.
- "New Problems of Immigration," The Forum, January 1901.
- "Some Observations on the Doctrine of Proximate Cause," Harvard Law Review, Vol. 15, No. 7, Mar., 1902.
- "The National Educational Association," The New Englander Magazine, Vol. XXVIII, March/August 1903.
- "Selection of Immigration," Annals of the American Academy of Political and Social Science, Vol. 24, Jul., 1904.
- "Propose Legislation on Immigration," Journal of Social Science, No. 44, September 1906.
- "The Immigration Problem," The Outlook, November 10, 1906.
- "The Future of American Ideals," The North American Review, January 1912.
- "The Recent History of Immigration and Immigration Restriction," Journal of Political Economy, Vol. 21, No. 8, Oct., 1913.
- "Experiments with Mrs. Caton," Proceedings of the American Society for Psychical Research, Vol. VIII, 1914.
- "The Harrison Case," Proceedings of the American Society for Psychical Research, Vol. XIII, 1919.
- "Immigration Restriction and World Eugenics," Journal of Heredity, Vol. X, 1919.
- “Aristocracy and Politics,” Journal of Heredity, Vol. X, 1919.
- "Qualifications, Aims and Methods," Proceedings of the American Society for Psychical Research, Vol. XIV, 1920.
- "Immigration and the World War," Annals of the American Academy of Political and Social Science, Vol. 93, Jan., 1921.
- "The Present and Future of Immigration," The North American Review, Vol. 213, No. 786, May, 1921.

== See also ==
- Charles Davenport
- Immigration to the United States
- Eugenics in the United States
- Madison Grant
- Robert DeCourcy Ward

== Sources ==
- Cannato, Vincent J. (2009). "Immigration and the Brahmins," Humanities, Volume 30, Number 3.
- Connelly, Matthew (2006). "Seeing Beyond the State: The Population Control Movement and the Problem of Sovereignty," Past & Present, No. 193.
- Higham, John (1952). "Origins of Immigration Restriction, 1882–1897: A Social Analysis," The Mississippi Valley Historical Review, Vol. 39, No. 1.
- Higham, John (1955). Strangers in the Land; Patterns of American Nativism, 1860–1925, Rutgers University Press.
- Jones, Maldwyn Allen (1960). American Immigration, University of Chicago Press.
- Phillips, Norman R. (1959). "Genetics and Political Conservatism," The Western Political Quarterly, Vol. 12, No. 3.
- Pleasants, Helene, ed. (1964). Biographical Dictionary of Parapsychology. New York: Garret Publications.
- Pula, James S. (1995). "The Progressives, the Immigrant, and the Workplace: Defining Public Perceptions, 1900–1914," Polish American Studies, Vol. 52, No. 2.
