= GeoSphere Austria =

Geosphere Austria
- Bundesanstalt für Geologie, Geophysik, Klimatologie und Meteorologie

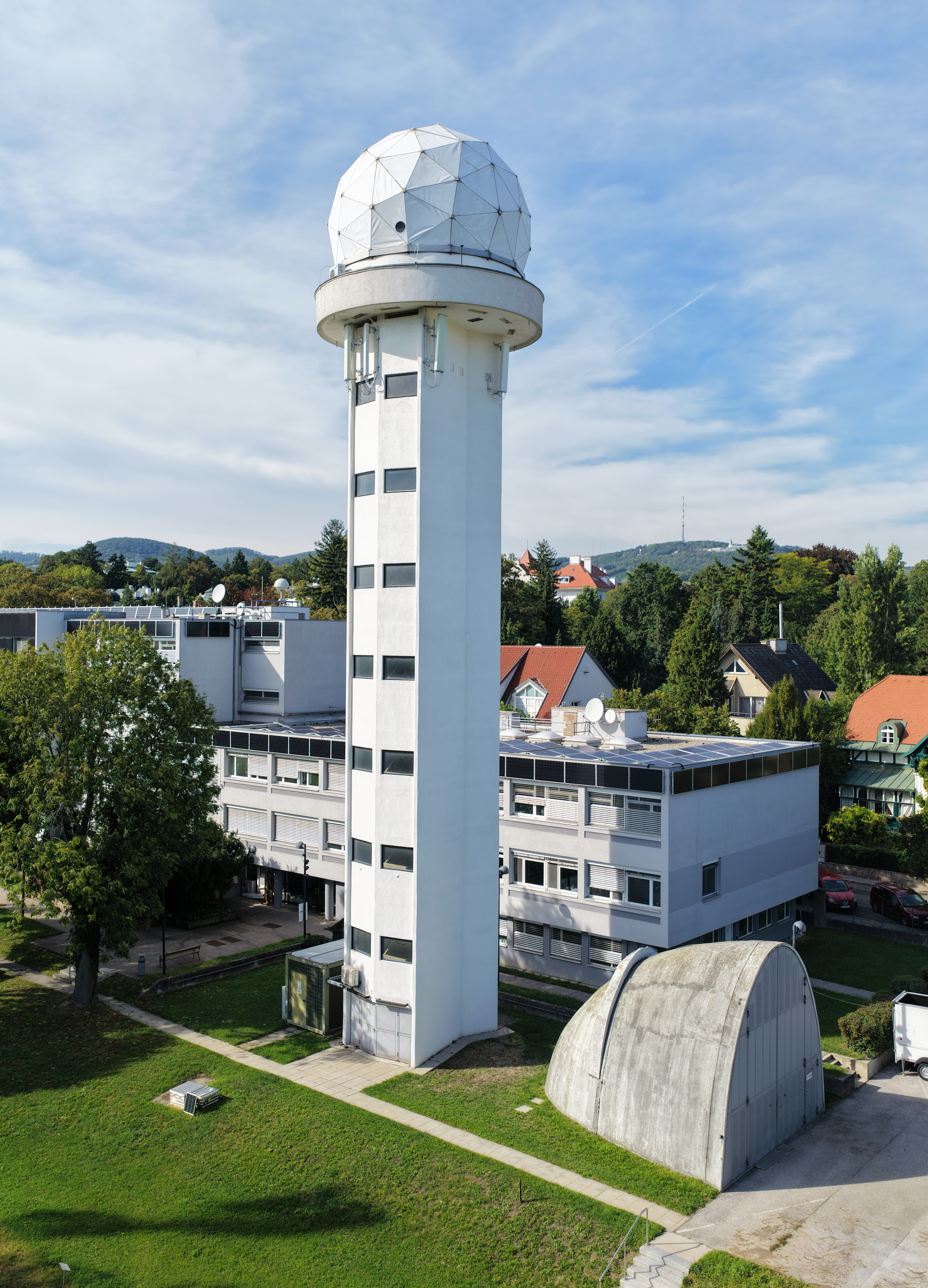
- Weather radar tower of GeoSphere Austria in Vienna

Agency overview
- Formed: 1 January 2023
- Preceding agencies: Central Institute for Meteorology and Geodynamics; Geological Survey of Austria
- Jurisdiction: (Austria) Austrian Federal Government
- Headquarters: Hohe Warte 38, Döbling, Vienna; 48.2485°N 16.3558°E
- Employees: 500 (2026)
- Agency executives: Sylvia Bauer-Beck; Andreas Schaffhauser
- Website: geosphere.at

GeoSphere Austria is the national geological, geophysical, climatological and meteorological service of Austria. Its headquarters are located at Hohe Warte (Vienna) and additional offices are in Vienna, Graz, Salzburg, Innsbruck and Klagenfurt. It was formed on 1 January 2023 by a merger of the world's oldest independent meteorological service ZAMG and the Geological Survey of Austria.

== Organization ==
=== Divisions ===
As of 2026, GeoSphere Austria is organized into two directorates general with seven divisions in total:

- Scientific Directorate General, headed by Andreas Schaffhauser
  - Meteorological Services and Regional Offices
  - Climate and Environment Services
  - Geophysical and Applied Geological Services
  - Basic Geological Services
  - ICT Services
- Administrative Directorate General, headed by Sylvia Bauer-Beck
  - Finance
  - Human Resources

=== Locations ===
Offices (red circles) and observatories (blue triangles) of GeoSphere Austria

GeoSphere Austria is headquartered at Hohe Warte, Döbling, Vienna where its predecessor the Central Institute for Meteorology and Geodynamics was located. The new institute also retained the offices of its other predecessor, the Geological Survey of Austria at Neulinggasse 38, Landstraße, Vienna. Both locations feature a library. In addition GeoSphere Austria operates the Austrian Space Weather Office in Graz.

To serve the whole country, there are regional offices in Graz, Salzburg, Innsbruck and Klagenfurt.

Finally, GeoSphere Austria operates two observatories:

- the Sonnblick Observatory at Hoher Sonnblick, a 3,106 meters high mountain on the main Alpine chain on the border of Carinthia and Salzburg
- the Conrad Observatory near Pernitz, Lower Austria, an underground geophysical research facility
