= Winslow Warren =

American lawyer (1838–1930)

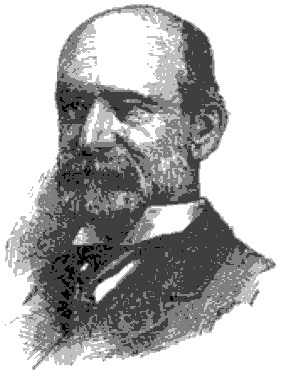
- Born: March 20, 1838; Plymouth, Massachusetts, U.S.
- Died: April 3, 1930 (aged 92); Dedham, Massachusetts, U.S.
- Education: Harvard Law School (1860)
- Occupation: Attorney
- Political party: Democratic
- Spouse: Mary Lincoln Tinkham (m. 1867; died 1864)
- Children: 4, including Charles
- Relatives: James and Mercy Otis Warren (great-grandparents)

Winslow Warren (March 20, 1838 – April 3, 1930) was an American attorney who served as Collector of Customs for the Port of Boston during the second administration of Grover Cleveland. From 1902 to 1930, was president general of the Society of Cincinnati.

== Early life ==
Warren was born on March 20, 1838, in Plymouth, Massachusetts, to Dr. Winslow Warren and Margaret Bartlett Warren. His great-grandparents were James and Mercy Otis Warren.

Warren attended public schools in Plymouth. He then graduated from Harvard College in 1858 and Harvard Law School in 1860. He completed his legal training in the office of his uncle, Sidney Barnett, and was admitted to the Massachusetts bar in March 1861.

On January 3, 1867, Warren married Mary Lincoln Tinkham of Boston. The couple took up residence in Dedham, Massachusetts.

== Legal and business career ==
Warren was a director of the Columbian National Life Insurance Company and for many years served as legal counsel for the Boston and Providence Railroad. From 1899 to 1911, Warren was an overseer of Harvard University.

== Social organizations ==
Warren served as president general of the Massachusetts Society of the Cincinnati and was the vice president of the Society's national organization from 1896 until 1902 when he became the Society's president general. He was also president of the University Club, the Unitarian Club of Boston, and the Massachusetts Reform League and the vice president of the Massachusetts Historical Society.

Warren also served a president of the L'Enfant Memorial Association, which sought to arouse interest in the erection of a monument to Pierre Charles L'Enfant on the National Mall and vice president of the Bunker Hill Monument Association.

== Politics ==
Warren was a life-long member of the Democratic Party was a prominent figure in public affairs in Dedham, Massachusetts. He served as president of the Dedham Water Company. In 1908, Warren broke with the Democratic Party and supported Republican William Howard Taft over William Jennings Bryan.

From 1861 to 1894, Warren served as a United States Commissioner. In 1876 he was an unsuccessful candidate for a seat in the Massachusetts House of Representatives. From 1894 to 1898, Warren served as the Collector of Customs for the Port of Boston.

== Personal life and death ==
Warren and his wife had two sons and two daughters, one of whom, Charles Warren, was a Pulitzer Prize-winning author and a United States Assistant Attorney General during the Woodrow Wilson administration. He was chairman of the board of trustees of the Dedham Public Library.

Warren died on April 3, 1930, at his home in Dedham.

Government offices
| Preceded by Alanson W. Beard | Collector of Customs for the Port of Boston; 1894–1898 | Succeeded by George H. Lyman |
