= Conrad Observatory =

Austrian geophysical research facility

Coordinates: 47°55′38.59″N 15°51′32.17″E

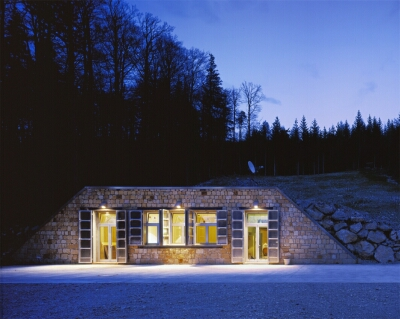

The Conrad Observatory is an underground geophysical research facility of GeoSphere Austria. The basic task of the observatory is monitoring relevant physical parameters that are of decisive importance for our understanding of processes on and below earth. At the Conrad Observatory, seismic activities (seismology), variations in gravitational acceleration and mass changes (gravimetry), magnetic field variations, geodetic parameters, atmospheric waves, as well as meteorological data are continuously monitored.

The Conrad Observatory consists of two parts:

1. The seismic-gravimetric observatory (SGO) has been opened in 2002.
2. The geomagnetic observatory (GMO) operates since 2014.

== History ==
The Conrad Observatory is the only observatory of this particular type and is located on top of the Trafelberg (1146 m above m.s.l.) next to Muggendorf, near Pernitz in Lower Austria, approximately 45 km southwest of Vienna.

It is named after the seismologist and climatologist Prof. Dr. Victor Conrad( 1876–1962) who was employed for many years at the Central Institution for Meteorology and Geodynamics (ZAMG), the predecessor of GeoSphere Austria. Besides the financial support by the federal government and the province of Lower Austria, the construction has been made possible by the legacy of Conrad's widow, Ida F. Conrad. By 2002 this legacy, donated to the ZAMG in order to set up a scientific research building, had increased to 1.2 million Euro, so that more than half of the first construction stage could be built thereby.

In 2008, the decision to extend the observatory was made by the ministry of science and the province of Lower Austria.

== The Tasks ==
=== Seismology ===
Seismologic monitoring of minor ground motion caused by, for instance, distant earthquakes, requires a worldwide measuring network at quiet sites with most sensitive measurement devices for the best interpretation. The observatory is part of the national as well as international network and presently serves, amongst others, the

- monitoring of worldwide seismicity,
- recording of nuclear weapons tests,
- calibration of seismometers,
- development and test of new measuring systems, and
- comparison of various measuring instruments.

This site is considered as the master station of the seismologic network of the Austrian Seismological Survey. The worldwide seismicity can be observed starting from magnitude 4.

=== Gravimetry ===
Variations of the Earth's gravitational field caused by tidal forces and geodynamic processes can be detected by high-precision measuring devices. One of these devices – the superconductive gravimeter GWR C025, of which about 35 other instruments exist worldwide, is run by the GeoSphere's department for geophysics together with the University of Vienna's Institute for Meteorology and Geophysics.

=== Magnetics ===
Since 2014 the geomagnetic section of the Conrad Observatory is in operation. It serves the detection and investigation of the geomagnetic field as well as the development of measuring devices. The topics of research are the geomagnetic field's temporal variations and their consequences, e.g. for navigation and climate. Geomagnetic storms caused by solar wind and solar flares (protuberances) are of high interest, too, because these events impact telecommunications, route guidance systems, electrical power supply stations, and safety systems.

=== Nuclear Test Ban monitoring ===
Besides these fields of investigation, the observatory is directly connected with the CTBTO (Comprehensive Test Ban Treaty Organization), a specialised agency of the United Nations. The Conrad Observatory features testing facilities of the CTBTO for two different monitoring procedures, infrasound and seismology. The observatory also serves as training school for station advisors of the International Monitoring System (IMS).

== The edifice ==
The site is characterized by extremely low microseismicity. The fact that the observatory is almost completely located underground, where disturbances of this type are reduced, contributes to the suitability of this site. The almost constant temperature in the measuring adit and the boreholes accounts for the high quality of the measurements. The observatory is equipped with an uninterruptible power supply and connected with the GeoSphere in Vienna by data lines. All devices, the electrical power supply, the temperature etc. can be controlled and regulated with a remote surveillance system. The seismic part of the Conrad Observatory comprises amongst others a tunnel of 150 m length that is equipped with several piers, four boreholes (three of them 100 m deep, one 50 m) as well as laboratories. A VSAT system is used for data transmission via satellite to the CTBTO's International Data Centre (IDC). A survey tunnel with a length of 400 m is the heart of the geomagnetic observatory (which is spatially separated from the seismic observatory) together with several laboratories and technical facilities. To ensure undisturbed measurements, the observatory is not open to the public.

== Bibliography ==
- Hammerl, Christa, Lenhardt, Wolfgang, Steinacker, Reinhold and Steinhauser, Peter (Hrsg.): Die Zentralanstalt für Meteorologie und Geodynamik 1851–2001. Leykam, Graz 2001, ISBN 3-7011-7437-7.
- Hammerl, Christa, Lenhardt, Wolfgang, Leonhardt, Roman and Granser, Harry: Austria's new earth observatory dedicated to Victor Conrad. EAGE. First Break 2011, p. 31-32.
