= Karl Kreil =

Austrian meteorologist and astronomer

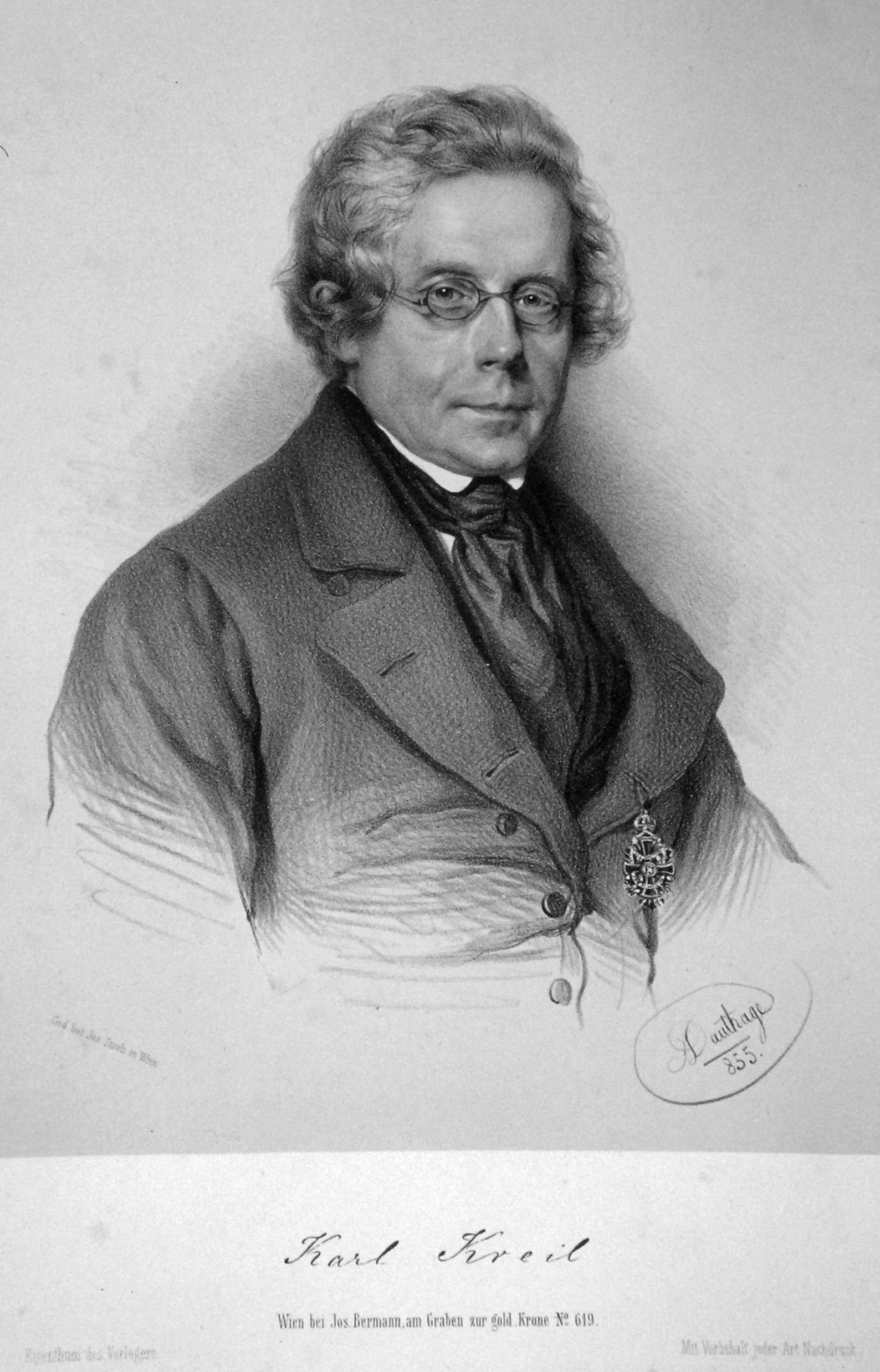
- Born: 4 November 1798; Ried im Innkreis
- Died: 21 December 1862 (aged 64); Vienna (Austria)
- Employer: Central Institution for Meteorology and Geodynamics; University of Vienna

Karl Kreil (1798–1862) was an Austrian meteorologist and astronomer, born in Ried.

Before university, he was educated at the Benedictine Kremsmünster Abbey, under the astronomer Boniface Schwarzenbrunner. He was educated at the University of Vienna, where he studied law before devoting himself to astronomy. In 1827 he became an assistant at the Vienna Observatory, from which he went to Milan in 1831 and thence in 1838 to Prague, where he was from 1845 to 1851 director of the observatory, then returned to Vienna to take charge of the Central Meteorological and Magnetic Bureau.

He made particularly important studies of terrestrial magnetism, discovering (1841) that it is practically unaffected by the moon and writing Anleitung zu den magnetischen Beobachtungen (second edition, 1858). Many automatically registering meteorological machines were devised by him. From 1849 until his death, he edited the Jahrbuch of the Central Bureau at Vienna. He wrote many works, including:

- Cenni storici e teoretici sulle comete (1832)
- Ueber die Natur und Bewegung der Kometen (1843)
- Klimatologie von Böhmen (1865)

== See also ==
- Names of asteroids: 6597 Kreil
