= Julius von Hann =

Austrian meteorologist

Julius Ferdinand von Hann
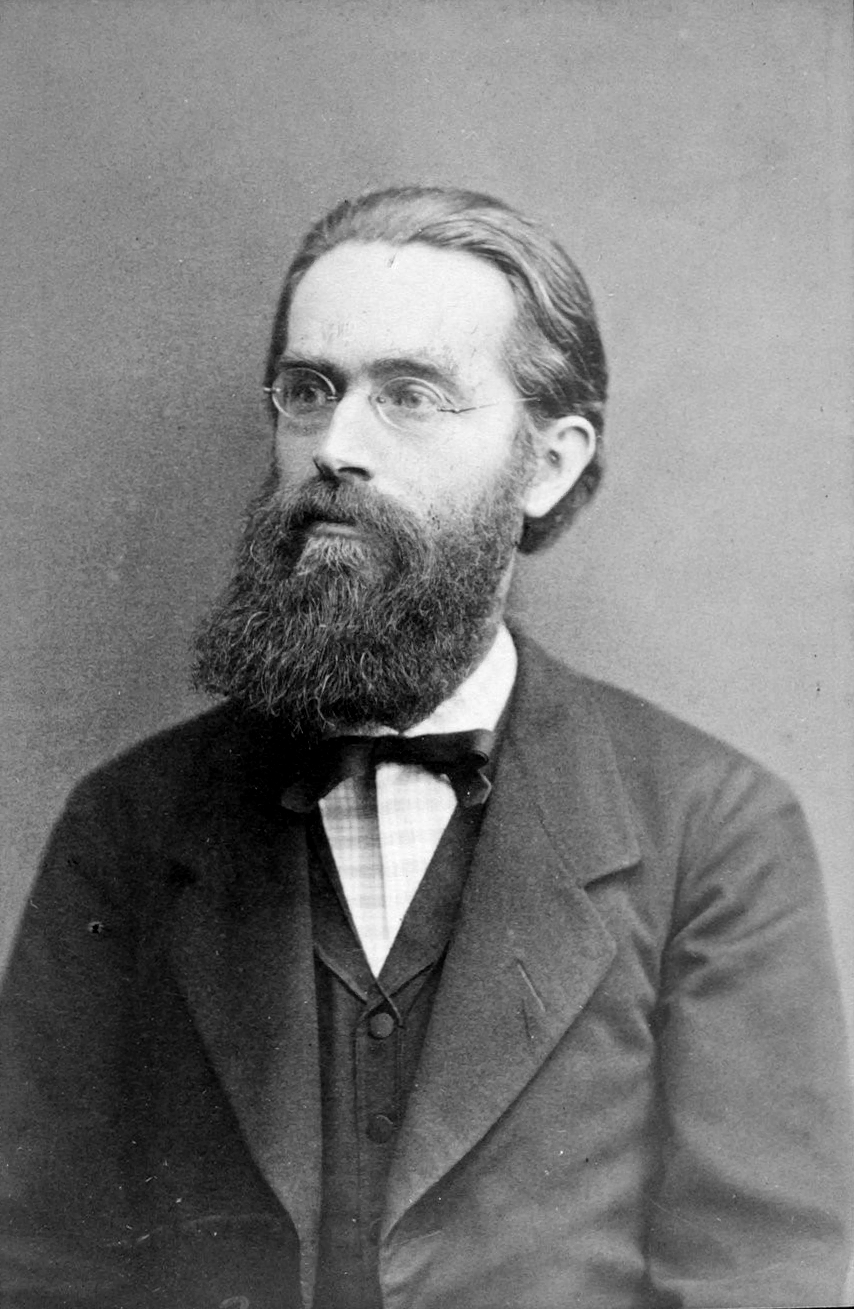
- Born: March 23, 1839; Wartberg ob der Aist near Linz
- Died: October 1, 1921 (aged 82); Vienna
- Occupation: Meteorologist
- Known for: Hann function
- Awards: Pour le Mérite (1912); Buys Ballot Medal (1893)

Julius Ferdinand von Hann (23 March 1839 in Wartberg ob der Aist near Linz – 1 October 1921 in Vienna) was an Austrian meteorologist. He is seen as a father of modern meteorology.

== Biography ==
He was educated at the gymnasium of Kremsmünster and then studied mathematics, chemistry and physics at the University of Vienna, then geology and paleontology under Eduard Suess and physical geography under Friedrich Simony. From 1865 to 1868, he was master at the Oberrealschule at Linz, and in 1865 was invited by Karl Jelinek to become the first editor of the Zeitschrift für Meteorologie. In 1877, he succeeded Jelinek as the director of the Meteorologische Zentralanstalt (Central Institute for Meteorology and Earth Magnetism) and was appointed professor of meteorology at the University of Vienna. In 1897, he retired as director and became professor of meteorology at the University of Graz, but returned to Vienna to fill the chair of professor of cosmic physics in 1900, where he remained until 1910. He became an international honorary member of the American Academy of Arts and Sciences in 1902. In 1912, he was made a foreign knight of the Prussian Ordre Pour le Mérite.

== Hann window ==
Hann invented a weighted moving average technique for combining meteorological data from neighboring regions, using the weights [1/4, 1/2, 1/4], known as Hann smoothing.

In signal processing, the Hann window is a window function, called the Hann function, derived from this technique by R. B. Blackman and John Tukey in 1959. Here, the use of the Hann window is called "hanning", e.g., "hanning" a signal is to apply the Hann window to it.

== Works ==
- Die Erde als Ganzes, ihre Atmosphäre und Hydrosphäre, 1872, 5th edition 1896
- Handbuch der Klimatologie, first issued 1883, revised editions until 1911
  - Handbook of Climatology. Part I. General Climatology. Macmillan. 1903; translated by Robert DeCourcy Ward
- Atlas der Meteorologie, 1887
- Allgemeine Erdkunde. Ein Leitfaden der astronomischen Geographie, Meteorologie, Geologie und Biologie, 5th edition 1896
- Lehrbuch der Meteorologie, 1901, 3rd edition 1915

He contributed many papers to the Sitzungsberichte der Kaiserlichen Akademie der Wissenschaften.
