= Geological Survey of Austria =

Coordinates: 48°11′57″N 16°23′08″E

Geological Survey of Austria, Austria
- Geologische Bundesanstalt (GBA)

Agency overview
- Formed: 15 November 1849 as kaiserlich-königliche Geologische Reichsanstalt (Franz Joseph I)
- Dissolved: 31.12.2022
- Superseding agency: GeoSphere Austria
- Type: subordinate federal agency
- Headquarters: Neulinggasse 38, Landstraße, Vienna, Austria
- Employees: 135 (2020)
- Agency executive: Robert Supper
- Parent department: Federal Ministry of Science and Research (Bundesministerium für Wissenschaft und Forschung)
- Website: www.geologie.ac.at

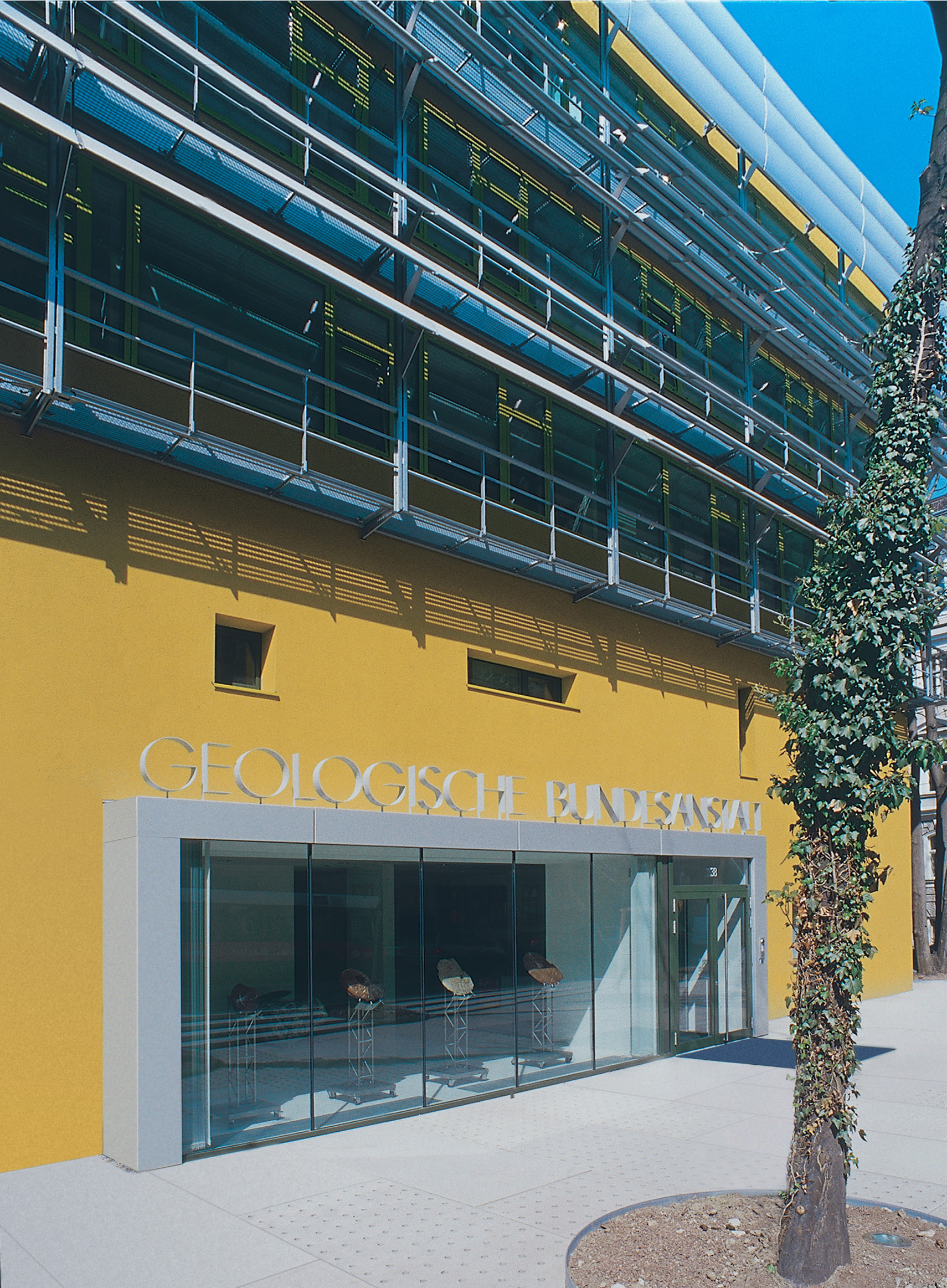
The Geological Survey of Austria

The Geological Survey of Austria (German: Geologische Bundesanstalt, GBA) in Vienna was a subordinate agency of the Federal Ministry of Education, Science and Research and was the central point for information and advice in the field of earth sciences for the Republic of Austria. The most important product of the GBA is a range of geological maps. These appear in various scales both as map series and as regional maps. They form the basis for responses to questions in many areas of business (waste disposal, water supply, transportation, raw materials, geothermal energy …) and also for research. The GBA was located in the district of Landstraße in Vienna.

As of 1 January 2023, it was merged with the Central Institution for Meteorology and Geodynamics into GeoSphere Austria.

== Sources ==
- Geologische Bundesanstalt (Hrsg.): Die Geologische Bundesanstalt in Wien. Böhlau-Verlag, Wien 1999. ISBN 3-205-99036-6
- Hans Georg Krenmayr (Red.): ROCKY AUSTRIA - Eine bunte Erdgeschichte von Österreich. Wien 2002. ISBN 3-85316-016-6
- Thomas Hofmann, Hans P. Schönlaub (Hrsg.): Geo-Atlas Österreich. Die Vielfalt des geologischen Untergrunds. 1. Auflage, Böhlau, 2008. ISBN 978-3-205-77726-7 (Übersicht über geowissenschaftliche Kartierungen Österreichs, Projekt der Geologischen Bundesanstalt)
