= Meteorologische Zeitschrift =

- Discipline: Meteorology, climatology
- Language: English
- Edited by: Stefan Emeis

Publication details
- Former name: Meteorologische Rundschau
- History: 1866-1944, 1992-present
- Publisher: Borntraeger Science Publishers on behalf of the Österreichische Gesellschaft für Meteorologie, the Deutsche Meteorologische Gesellschaft, and the Swiss Meteorological Society
- Frequency: Bimonthly
- Open access: Yes
- Impact factor: 2.072 (2019)

Standard abbreviations
- ISO 4: Meteorol. Z.

Indexing
- CODEN: MEZEEV
- ISSN: 0941-2948 (print); 1610-1227 (web)
- LCCN: 92649628
- OCLC no.: 166105260
- Meteorologische Rundschau
- ISSN: 0026-1211

Links
- Journal homepage; Online access; Online archive

The Meteorologische Zeitschrift (English: Meteorological Journal) is a bimonthly international peer-reviewed open access scientific journal covering research in meteorology and climatology. All papers published since 2000 are in English language. The journal was established in 1866 by the Österreichische Gesellschaft für Meteorologie (Austrian Meteorological Society) and is one of the oldest journals in the field. In 1884 a similar journal was established by the Deutsche Meteorologische Gesellschaft. The two journals merged in 1886 and existed until 1944. After being published separately (under different titles) in East and West Germany after 1945, the journal was reestablished in 1992 as a joint publication of the Austrian, Swiss, and German Meteorological Societies and is published by Borntraeger Science Publishers.

== Abstracting and indexing ==
The journal is abstracted and indexed in: Science Citation Index Expanded, Meteorological & Geoastrophysical Abstracts, Current Contents/Physical, Chemical and Earth Sciences, and GEOBASE. According to the Journal Citation Reports, the journal has a 2020 impact factor of 2.072.

== Editors ==
The following persons have been editor-in-chief of the journal:

- Julius von Hann (1866–1920)
- Gustav Hellmann (1892–1907)
- Stefan Emeis (Karlsruhe Institute of Technology, current)
