= Robert DeCourcy Ward =

American climatologist, author, and educator (1867–1931)

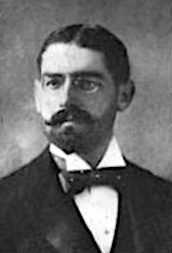
- Born: November 29, 1867; Boston, Massachusetts
- Died: November 12, 1931 (aged 63); Cambridge, Massachusetts
- Education: Harvard University (BA, MA)
- Occupations: Climatologist, writer, educator
- Spouse: Emma Lane (m. 1897)
- Children: Henry DeCourcy; Robert Saltonstall; Anna Saltonstall; Emma Lane

Robert DeCourcy Ward (November 29, 1867 – November 12, 1931) was an American climatologist, author, educator and leading eugenics and immigration reform advocate in the early 20th Century. He became the first ever professor of climatology in the United States and made contributions to the study of the climate. His advocacy for immigration reform and eugenics led him to co-found the Immigration Restriction League which was instrumental in the passage of the Immigration Act of 1924 which reduced Jewish and Italian immigration to the U.S. by over 95% and completely barred Asian immigration until 1952.

== Biography ==
Born on November 29, 1867, in Boston, Massachusetts, the son of Henry Veazey Ward and Anna Saltonstall (Merrill), he matriculated to Harvard University in 1885, where he received an A.B. in 1889. After graduation, he spent a year traveling through Europe. He joined the meteorology staff of Harvard University in 1890 as an assistant to William Morris Davis, later becoming an instructor in meteorology, then in climatology. Beginning in 1892, he served as editor of the American Meteorological Journal, a post he would hold until 1896 when it ceased publication. In Harvard graduate school, he studied meteorology for two years and was awarded an A.M. in 1893.

In 1894, he helped to co-found the Immigration Restriction League, a group of fellow Bostonians who were opposed to the growing influx of "undesirable immigrants". In his early writings, Ward noted that immigrants should not be excluded "on the ground of race, religion, or creed", but the group were concerned about the supposed deterioration in the quality of immigration and sought changes to the immigration laws. Ward served as a member of the group's executive committee until 1908. In the following years, he developed an interest in the then-new theory of eugenics and wrote several works on the subject. In 1913, he urged that the principles of eugenics be applied to immigrants, thereby denying entry to undesirable aliens on the basis of their physical, mental, or economic qualities.

On April 28, 1897, he was married to Emma Lane and the couple had four children: Henry DeCourcy (July 31, 1898), Robert Saltonstall (May 24, 1900), Anna Saltonstall (February 13, 1904), and Emma Lane (February 9, 1908). From June until February the following year, he spent time in South America studying the climatic conditions there. He became assistant professor of climatology at Harvard University in 1900. In 1903, Ward released a translated and updated version of Austrian meteorologist Julius von Hann's Handbuch der Klimatologie (1883), which became widely used.

From June through September 1908, he was a member of the Shaler Memorial Expedition to Brazil. In 1910, he was named full professor at Harvard, becoming the first professor of climatology in the United States. He spent part of 1910 in São Paulo, Brazil, studying the economic climatology of the region's coffee district. He was named president of the Association of American Geographers in 1917 and served as first president of the American Meteorological Society from 1920 to 1921. Ward appeared as a key witness to the U.S. Congress in favor of the Immigration Act of 1924. In 1925, he was appointed to the Harvard University Committee on Admission and served on that board until 1931. This committee reduced the size of the freshman class to 1,000 students and arbitrarily reduced the proportion of Jewish members to 15%.

During 1929, Professor Ward made a tour of the world, stopping in locations such as Shanghai, Hong Kong, and Manila to perform scientific studies. He died at his home in Cambridge, Massachusetts on November 12, 1931. During his career, he was a member of the American Academy of Arts and Sciences and the Royal Meteorological Society of London, and an honorary member of the American Clinical and Climatological Society. Ward was perhaps the first person to emphasize the understanding of climate as a dynamic concept, rather than the static view held in the past. He advocated the study of the relationship between people and the environment.

== Bibliography ==
- An investigation of the sea-breeze (1889) with William Morris Davis
- List of cloud photographs and lantern slides (1894)
- Meteorology as a university course (1895)
- A winter barograph curve from the South Pacific Ocean (1897)
- Practical exercises in elementary meteorology (1899)
- Sensible temperatures (1899)
- The relative humidity of our houses in winter (1902)
- The agricultural distribution of immigrants (1904)
- The restriction of immigration (1904)
- The National Exposition at Rio de Janeiro (1909)
- A visit to the Brazilian coffee country (1911)
- Abbot Lawrence Rotch (1913)
- The crisis in our immigration policy (1913)
- Immigration and the War (1916)
- The thunderstorms of the United States as climatic phenomena (1917)
- Climate: considered especially in relation to man (1918)
- Immigration restriction essential to Americanization (1919)
- The essential characteristics of United States climates (1920)
- Some characteristics of United States temperatures (1922)
- The new immigration law and its operation (1925)
- A climatologist's round-the-world voyage (1929)
- Climatology and some of its applications (1929)
- How far can man control his climate? (1930)
- The railroads versus the weather (1931)
- The acclimatization of the white race in the tropics (1931)
- The literature of climatology (1931)
- Westindien: climatology of the West Indies (1934)
- The climates of North America (1936) with Charles Franklin Brooks and A. Connor
