= Saltonstall =

Saltonstall may refer to:

== People ==
- Richard Saltonstall (mayor) (1517–1600), skinner and Lord Mayor of London
- Richard Saltonstall (1586–1661), colonist and nephew of the above Richard
- Wye Saltonstall (born 1602), English poet and translator, grandson of Lord Mayor Richard
- Nathaniel Saltonstall (1639–1707), Massachusetts judge during the Salem Witch Trials of 1692
- Gurdon Saltonstall (1666–1724), governor of Connecticut Colony
- Nathaniel Saltonstall (American Revolution) (1727–1807), captain of Connecticut naval privateer ships during the American Revolutionary War
- Dudley Saltonstall (1738–1796), captain in the Continental Navy during the American Revolutionary War
- Gurdon Saltonstall Mumford (1764–1831), New York congressman
- Leverett Saltonstall I (1783–1845), Massachusetts politician
- Gurdon Saltonstall Hubbard (1802–1886), Chicago businessman
- Richard Saltonstall Greenough (1819–1904), sculptor
- Lavena Saltonstall (1881–1957), English suffragette and writer
- Leverett Saltonstall (1892–1979), Republican Governor of Massachusetts and U.S. Senator
- Elizabeth Saltonstall (1900–1990), American painter and lithographer

== Other uses ==
- Lake Saltonstall (disambiguation)
- Mount Saltonstall, in the Queen Maud Mountains, Antarctica
- Saltonstall Mountain or Saltonstall Ridge, New Haven, Connecticut, U.S.

== See also ==
- Saltonstall family
