= William Gurdon Saltonstall =

American naval officer and merchant (1831–1889)

- Born: December 22, 1831 Salem, Massachusetts, U.S.
- Died: July 21, 1889 (aged 57) Domodossola, Italy
- Branch: Navy
- Wars: American Civil War
- Family: Saltonstall family

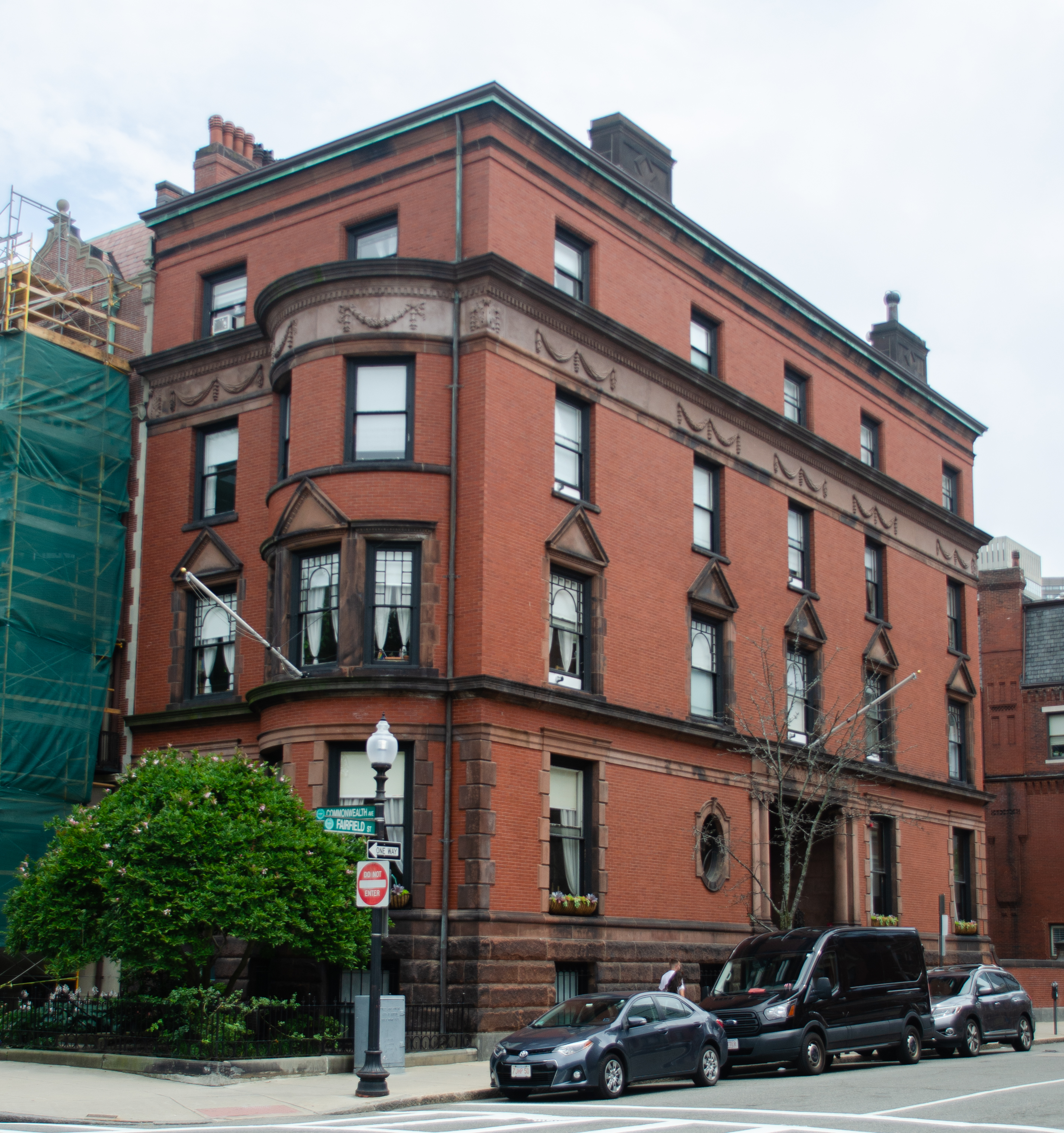
Saltonstall's Back Bay residence, designed by Peabody & Stearns

William Gurdon Saltonstall (December 22, 1831 – July 21, 1889) was an American naval officer during the U.S. Civil War and a prominent merchant.

== Early life ==
Saltonstall was born on December 22, 1831, in Salem, Massachusetts, into the prominent Saltonstall family. He was a younger son of lawyer Nathaniel Saltonstall (1784–1838) and Caroline (née Saunders) Saltonstall (1793–1882). His brother Henry Saltonstall was treasurer of the Pacific Mills of Lawrence, Massachusetts.

His paternal grandparents were Dr. Nathaniel Saltonstall and Anna (née White) Saltonstall of Haverhill. His paternal uncle, U.S. Representative Leverett Saltonstall I, married his maternal aunt, Mary Elizabeth Saunders, and his first cousin was Leverett Saltonstall II, the Collector of Customs for the Port of Boston who married Rose Smith Lee, a sister of William's wife. His maternal grandparents were Thomas Saunders and Elizabeth (née Elkins) Saunders.

== Career ==
During the U.S. Civil War, Saltonstall commanded in succession two gunboats in the Federal Navy and rendered distinguished service. He "rose from the position of supercargo to master" and was appointed acting lieutenant of the Minnesota. During the blockade off of the Carolinas especially, he won commendation for "gallant conduct" while commander of a gunboat, and in the Little Washington affair made himself known as a brave officer. He left the Navy as Acting Volunteer Lieutenant Commander. He later became a Companion of the Massachusetts Commandery of the Military Order of the Loyal Legion of the United States.

After the war, he became a merchant and was treasurer of the York Manufacturing Company, as well as the Everett Mills. He also served as a director of the New England Bank, the Bell Telephone Company, and the Boylston Insurance Company.

== Personal life ==
In 1867, Saltonstall was married to Josephine Rose Lee (1843–1889), the youngest daughter of Harriet Paine (née Rose) Lee and John Clarke Lee, founder of Lee, Higginson & Co. Together, they were the parents of:

- Robert Saltonstall (1870–1938), who married Caroline James Stevenson, a daughter of Brig. Gen. Robert Hooper Stevenson (brother of Thomas G. Stevenson), in 1904.
- Lucy Sanders Saltonstall (1871–1947), who married Neal Rantoul.
- John Lee Saltonstall (1878–1959), who married Gladys Durant Rice, a daughter of Dr. Clarence Charles Rice, in 1910.
- Rosamund Saltonstall (1881–1953), who married Charles Crooke Auchincloss, son of Edgar Stirling Auchincloss and brother of James C. Auchincloss, in 1906.

For many years he lived with his mother on Chestnut Street but not long before his death, his winter residence was on Commonwealth Avenue in Boston, and his summer home was at Beverly Farms.

Saltonstall died of heart disease at Domo d'Ossola, Italy, a town near the Swiss border, on July 21, 1889. He had gone abroad in hopes of improving his health, which had declined since the death of his wife in January 1889.

=== Descendants ===
Through his son Robert, he was a grandfather of William Gurdon Saltonstall (1905–1989), the 8th Principal of Phillips Exeter Academy.

Through his son John, he was a grandfather of John L. Saltonstall Jr., Elizabeth Lee Saltonstall, who married August Belmont IV and Richard Lockwood Tower, and Jean Saltonstall (1921–2011), who married Benjamin Crowninshield Bradlee of Watergate infamy, and after their divorce, and Oscar Hausserman Jr.
