= Senator Saltonstall (disambiguation) =

Leverett A. Saltonstall (1892–1979) was a U.S. Senator from Massachusetts from 1945 to 1967. Senator Saltonstall may also refer to:

- Leverett Saltonstall I (1783–1845), Massachusetts State Senate, great-grandfather of Leverett A.
- William L. Saltonstall (1927–2009), Massachusetts State Senate
