= John Clarke Lee =

American lawyer and merchant (1804–1877)

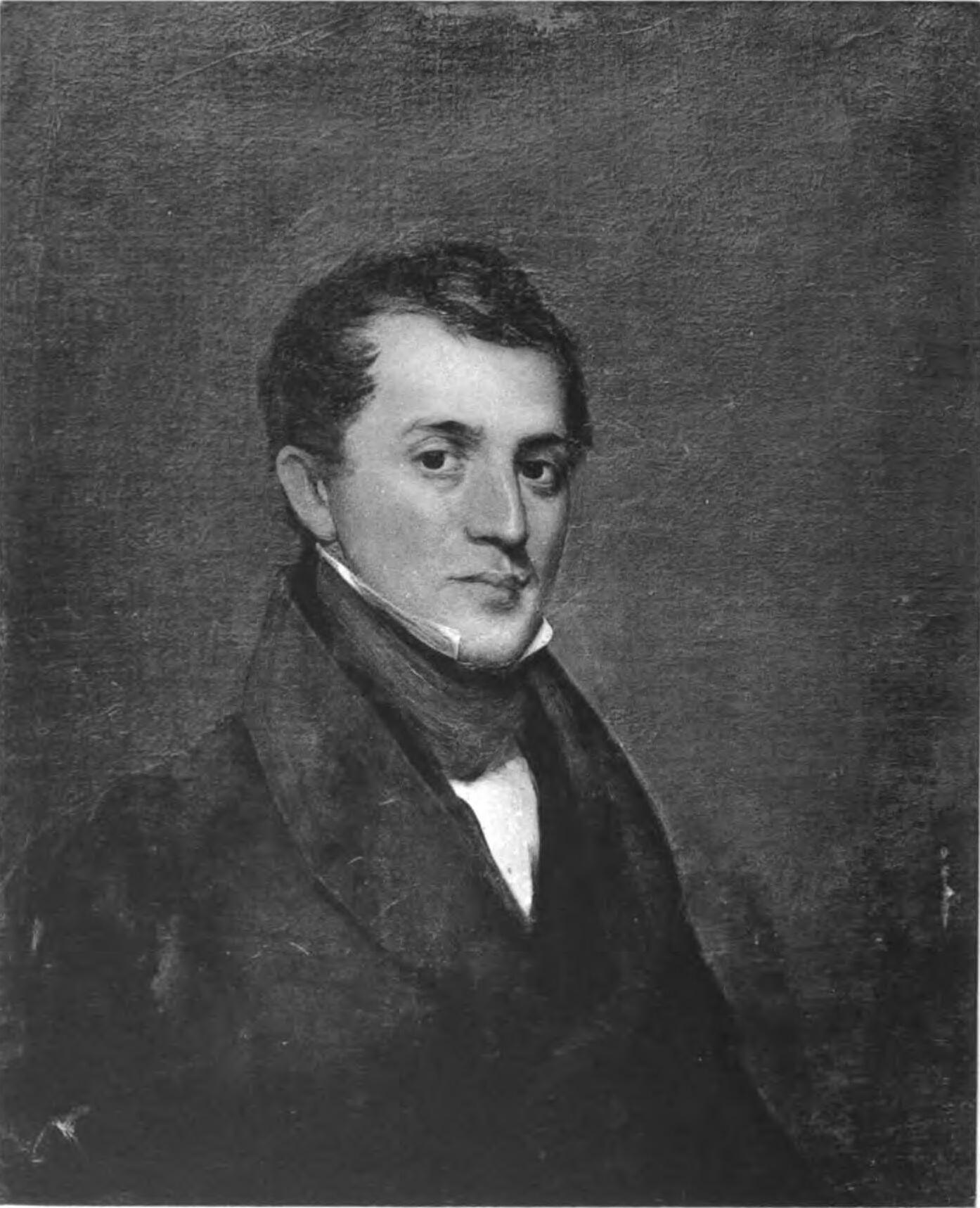
- portrait by Chester Harding
- Born: April 9, 1804; Boston, Massachusetts
- Died: November 19, 1877 (aged 73); Boston, Massachusetts
- Education: Harvard College
- Spouse: Harriet Paine Rose (after 1826)
- Children: 10
- Parent(s): Nathaniel Cabot Lee; Mary Ann Cabot
- Relatives: Endicott Peabody (grandson); Alice Hathaway Lee Roosevelt (granddaughter); George Cabot Lee Jr. (grandson); Endicott Peabody Saltonstall (grandson)

John Clarke Lee (April 9, 1804 – November 19, 1877) was an American lawyer, merchant, banker and politician who co-founded the prominent stock brokerage firm of Lee, Higginson & Co.

== Early life ==
Lee was born on April 9, 1804, at Tremont Place in Boston, Massachusetts, and named after the Rev. John Clarke, D.D. He was the son of Nathaniel Cabot Lee (1772–1806) and Mary Ann (née Cabot) Lee (1784–1809), who were first cousins. After his father's death in Barbados, his mother married Francis Blanchard. His mother died at 25, shortly after giving birth to his only sibling, half-sister Elizabeth Cabot Blanchard, who also died young at age 33 in 1842 after becoming the first wife of U.S. Senator Robert Charles Winthrop and having three children.

His maternal grandparents were Anna (née Clarke) Cabot and Francis Cabot (brother of U.S. Senator George Cabot), who lived in Natchez, Mississippi. His paternal grandparents were Capt. Joseph Lee and Elizabeth (née Cabot) Lee (daughter of Joseph Cabot and Elizabeth Higginson Cabot).

After losing his father and mother by the age of five, he went back and forth between Wenham with the family of the Rev. Rufus Anderson and the Pickering family, and Duxbury after the death of his step-father in 1813. He also spent time with his great-grandmother, Sarah Pickering Clarke (widow of Capt. John Clarke and sister of Col. Timothy Pickering). He later went to Salem where he entered the private school of Abiel Chandler and John Brazer Davis, where he prepared for college. Lee entered Harvard College in 1819. He graduated with the class of 1823 but did not collect his diploma until 1842.

== Career ==
After leaving Harvard, Lee studied law under the direction of John Pickering, Esq. but decided to pursue a business career and formed a partnership with John Merrick Jr. Their mercantile business lasted from 1826 to 1830 and towards the end, a third partner, William Sturgis Jr., joined them. He later served as a trustee and officer of the Salem Savings Bank, a director of the Exchange Bank and of the Eastern Railroad Corporation and represented Salem in the Massachusetts General Court from 1834 to 1835.

On May 1, 1848, Lee and merchant George Higginson of Boston established Lee, Higginson & Co. with offices at 47 State Street in Boston. Lee's son George joined the firm in November 1848 and was admitted as a partner on April 1, 1853. Higginson's son, Henry Lee Higginson, joined the firm as a partner in 1868.

=== Later life ===
Following his retirement from Lee, Higginson & Co. at the end of 1862, Lee traveled to Europe. The first visit was in 1869 to 1870, travelling extensively throughout Great Britain and the continent and the second in 1872 to 1873, mostly spent in the South of France and in London while visiting his daughter, the wife of Samuel E. Peabody who was a partner in the London banking firm of J.S. Morgan & Co.

== Personal life ==
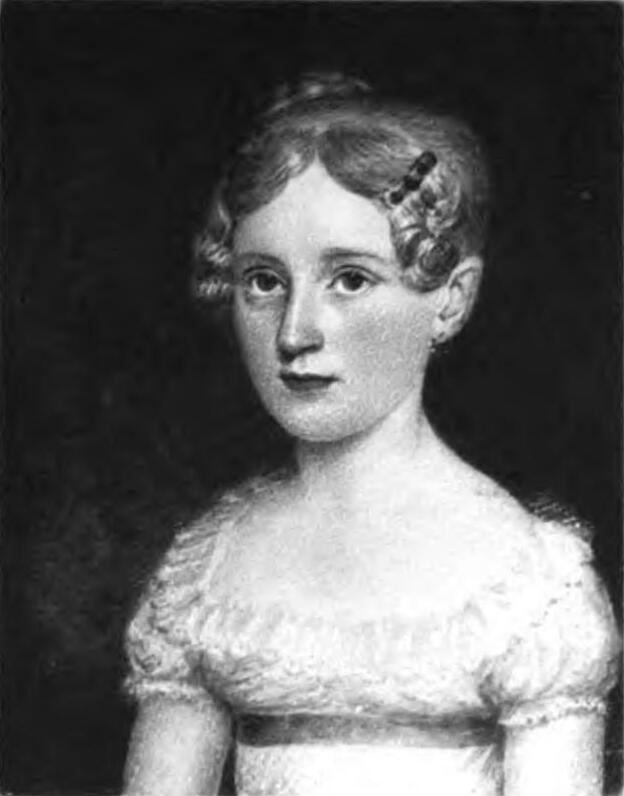
His wife, Harriet Paine Rose Lee

On July 18, 1826, Lee was married to Harriet Paine Rose (1804–1885), who had been born on Antigua Island in the British West Indies. Harriet was a daughter of Joseph Warner Rose and Harriet (née Paine) Rose (a daughter of Dr. William Paine, a United Empire Loyalist who chose to return to the U.S.). Together, they were the parents of ten children, nine of whom survived to adulthood, including:

- John Rose Lee (1827–1908), who married Lucy Chandler Howard in 1856.
- Marianne Cabot Lee (1828–1911), who married merchant and banker Samuel Endicott Peabody, in 1848.
- George Cabot Lee (1830–1910), who married Caroline Watts Haskell, a daughter of Elisha Haskell, in 1857.
- Harriet Rose Lee (1831–1912), who died unmarried.
- William Paine Lee (1833–1888), who married Hannah Greely Stevenson, sister of Thomas G. Stevenson.
- Rose Smith Lee (1835–1903), who married Leverett Saltonstall II, son of U.S. Representative Leverett Saltonstall I, in 1854.
- Francis Henry Lee (1836–1913), who married Sophia Edgell Willson in 1871.
- Charles Jackson Lee (1839–1898), who married Mary Ann Berry in 1864.
- Josephine Rose Lee (1843–1889), who married William Gurdon Saltonstall in 1867.

Lee died in Salem, Massachusetts, on November 19, 1877, after spending the summer with his family in North Conway, New Hampshire.

=== Descendants ===
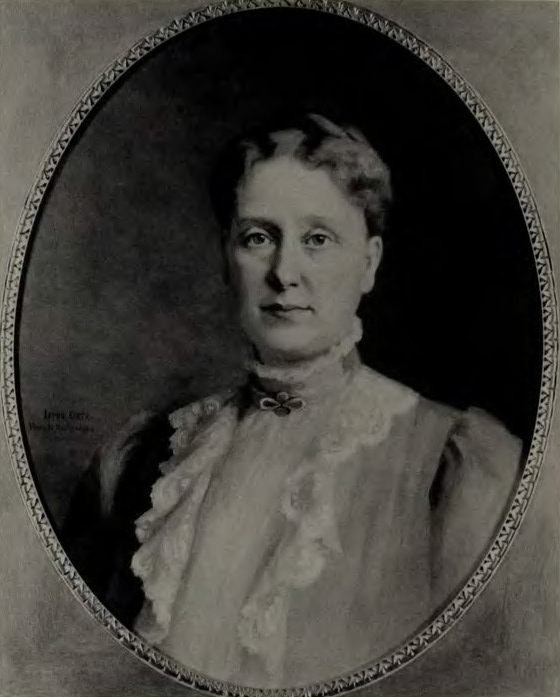
His daughter, Rose Smith Lee Saltonstall

Through his daughter Marianne, he was a grandfather of Endicott Peabody (1857–1944), an Episcopal priest who founded the Groton School for Boys.

Through his son George, he was a grandfather of Alice Hathaway Lee (1861–1884), who became the first wife of Theodore Roosevelt, later President of the United States, and George Cabot Lee Jr. (1871–1950), who joined the family firm in September 1900 as a junior partner.

Through his daughter Rose, he was a grandfather of attorney Endicott Peabody Saltonstall (1879–1922) and a great-grandfather of Massachusetts Governor and U.S. Senator Leverett Saltonstall.

Through his daughter Josephine, he was a grandfather of Rosamond Saltonstall (wife of Charles C. Auchincloss), and Robert Saltonstall and a great-grandfather of William Saltonstall, the 8th principal of Phillips Exeter Academy.
