= Charles C. Auchincloss =

American lawyer and stockbroker

- Born: Charles Crooke Auchincloss; September 24, 1881; New York City, New York
- Died: May 14, 1961 (aged 79); New York City, New York
- Education: Yale University; Harvard Law School
- Spouse: Rosamund Saltonstall (m. 1906; died 1953)
- Children: Rosamond Saltonstall Plowden-Wardlaw; Richard Saltonstall Auchincloss; Josephine Lee Nicholas
- Relatives: James C. Auchincloss (brother); Hugh D. Auchincloss, Jr. (cousin); Stuart Coats (cousin); Burton J. Lee III (grandson)

Charles Crooke Auchincloss (September 24, 1881 – May 14, 1961) was an American lawyer and stockbroker.

== Early life ==
Auchincloss was born on September 24, 1881, in New York City. He was one of eight children, seven sons and one daughter, born to Edgar Stirling Auchincloss (1847–1892) and Maria LaGrange (née Sloan) Auchincloss (1847–1929), who married in 1872. Among his siblings were Samuel Sloan Auchincloss, Hugh Auchincloss, U.S. Representative James C. Auchincloss, Gordon Aucincloss, and Reginald LaGrange Auchincloss.

Among his uncles were Hugh Dudley Auchincloss (father of Hugh D. Auchincloss, Jr.) and John Winthrop Auchincloss (grandfather of Louis Auchincloss). His maternal aunt, Sarah Auchincloss, married Sir James Coats, 1st Baronet of the Scottish thread-manufacturing family, and they were the parents of Sir Stuart Coats, 2nd Baronet and British Member of Parliament. His maternal grandparents were Mary (née Elmendorf) Sloan and New York State Senator Samuel Sloan, who served as president of the Delaware, Lackawanna and Western Railroad for 26 years.

Auchincloss graduated from Yale University in 1903, where he was a varsity oarsmen. He received his law degree from Harvard Law School in 1906.

== Career ==
After briefly practicing law with Strong & Cadwalader and Lord Day & Lord, he was with Littlefield & Littlefield from 1907 to 1917. Upon the outbreak of World War I, he gave up his law practice and enlisted in the U.S. Army, ending the war as a commissioned Field Artillery Captain. Following the War, he joined the stock brokerage firm of F. S. Moseley & Co., of which he remained a partner until his death in 1961.

During World War II, he was chairman of the Officers Service Committee that was headquartered in the Commodore Hotel in Manhattan. The committee assisted in providing entertainment for officers of the armed forces.

Auchincloss was a president of the Regency Club, the Links Club, the Links Golf Club, and on the boards of the Piping Rock Club and Racquet and Tennis Club. He also served as treasurer of the Correctional Association of New York (formerly the Prison Association of New York) and was a director of the American Can Company (today part of Primerica) and the National Biscuit Company (today known as Nabisco).

== Personal life ==
In June 1906, Auchincloss was married to Rosamund Saltonstall (1881–1953) of Boston at the Saltonstall home, 30 Fairfield St., Back Bay, Boston, by the Rev. Dr. Endicott Peabody. He held a bachelor dinner at Delmonico's on the Wednesday before the wedding. She was a daughter of the late William Gurdon Saltonstall, and Josephine Rose (née Lee) Saltonstall (youngest daughter of John Clarke Lee, founder of Lee, Higginson & Co.). After their wedding, they sailed for Europe before making their home in New York City. Together, they were the parents of:

- Rosamond Saltonstall Auchincloss (1907–1971), who married Burton James Lee Jr. in 1929. They divorced and she married Benjamin Carlton Betner in 1951. They divorced and she married Thomas Campbell Plowden-Wardlaw in 1954.
- Richard Saltonstall Auchincloss (1909–1990), who married Mary King Wainwright (1911–2008), a daughter of Clement Reeves Wainwright, in 1939.
- Josephine Lee Auchincloss (1912–2005), who married Benjamin Carlton Betner in 1932. They divorced and he married her elder sister, Rosamond, in 1951 while she married Harry Ingersoll Nicholas in 1960.

His wife died on February 4, 1953, in Beacon, New York after a long illness. Auchincloss died at his home, 120 East 70th Street, on May 14, 1961. After his death, the Parke-Bernet Galleries held an auction of French, English and other furniture from his estate.

=== Descendants ===
Through his eldest daughter Rosamond, he was a grandfather of Burton J. Lee III (1930–2016), the Physician to the President from 1989 to 1993, and Rosamond Saltonstall Lee (1930–2021), a debutante who married Francis Irénée du Pont II, and Bernard Jackson Felch.

=== Residences ===
In 1916, Auchincloss built Builtover, today known as the Charles Crooke Auchincloss House, a 25-room Georgian Revival mansion built by the firm of Peabody, Wilson & Brown in Roslyn, New York. The Olmstead Brothers, the same firm that designed Central Park, were the architects for the grounds in 1917. In 1925, burglars entered their Roslyn home during a storm and "stole Oriental rugs, tapestries and household ornaments valued at more than $10,000". His wife became a well known hostess and member of society. In 1946, they sold Builtover to Dr. Daniel Twohig who renamed the mansion My Beloved. The Long Island Expressway was later built on the other side of the property.

In 1930, after almost a decade of living in a mansion at 12 East 71st Street, just off Fifth Avenue and next to the Henry Clay Frick House, Auchincloss took over 120 East 70th Street from his brother, Edgar, who lived there with his wife and family, together with their brothers Gordon and Samuel, who also lived there with their wives. On October 19, 1930, The New York Times announced Charles' plans to replace the 70th Street house with "a five-story, brick, marble and granite trim" residence designed by Edward S. Hewitt. The home was completed a year later in the stylized neo-Georgian design and sat on a street that Fortune Magazine described nine-years later as "the most beautiful residential block" in the city.
