= John H. Rogers =

American politician

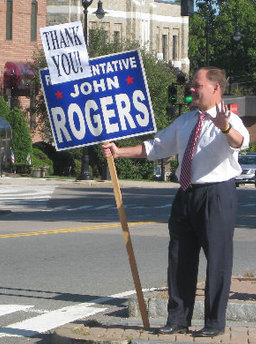
- Rogers in 2014

Member of the Massachusetts House of Representatives from the 12th Norfolk district
- Incumbent
- Assumed office 1992
- Preceded by: Gregory Sullivan

Personal details
- Born: October 22, 1964 (age 61) Norwood, Massachusetts, U.S.
- Party: Democratic
- Spouse: Brenda Rogers (m. 2000)
- Education: University College, Galway School of Law, Ireland, Brandeis University, Suffolk University Law School
- Occupation: attorney

John H. Rogers is a Democratic member of the Massachusetts House of Representatives, representing the 12th Norfolk District since 1992, which includes all of Norwood and parts of Walpole.

== Early life and education ==
Representative Rogers attended Saint Catherine of Sienna Grammar School and Public Schools in Norwood, Massachusetts before graduating from Catholic Memorial High School in West Roxbury. He graduated cum laude from Brandeis University in 1987 with a Bachelor of Arts degree. In 1992, he received a Juris Doctor from Suffolk University Law School and also studied at the University of Galway Law School in Ireland.

== Committee assignments ==
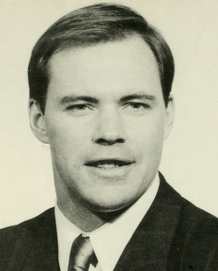
Rogers in 1995

Representative Rogers currently serves at the Ranking Member of the Joint Committees on Education, Children & Families, and Labor and Workforce Development.

He served as House Majority Leader from January 2005 until January 2009. He served as Chairman of the House Ways and Means Committee from January 2001 through January 2005. As Chairman, he was the chief budget writer for the Massachusetts House of Representatives. During his tenure in the Legislature, he has also served as Chairman of the Joint Committee on Taxation (1999-2001) and Chairman of the Joint Committee on the Judiciary (1997-1999). Representative Rogers has also served as Vice Chairman of several committees – the House Committee on Steering and Policy, the House Committee on Housing and Urban Development and the House Committee on Post Audit and Oversight – while also serving as a member of the Joint Committees on Banks and Banking; Energy; and Criminal Justice.

Rep. Rogers has also been chosen to lead several different caucuses and special legislative committees. From 1994–2001, he served as House Chair of the Legislative Caucus on Older Citizens' Concerns (also known as the "Elder Caucus"). In 1998, he was appointed by former Speaker Thomas Finneran to chair a special legislative committee to reform the adoption laws in Massachusetts so as to accelerate the adoption process and ensure that the best interests of the child are of paramount concern in the process. In 1999, he was recognized by the Massachusetts Families for Kids, the Legislative Caucus on Foster Care and the Department of Social Services for his efforts as Chairman of that Ad-Hoc Committee on Adoption and as author of the landmark Adoption Law of 1999. In October 2004, he was chosen to co-chair the legislatively created Commission to Study the Provision of Counsel to Indigent Persons in the Commonwealth which issued a major report, now known as the "Rogers Report," recommending improvements to the so-called CPCS system in March 2006. In 2007, he chaired the special House Committee on Child Abuse and Neglect and authored the report First Do No Harm

== Unsuccessful 2009 bid for state house speaker ==
In early 2008, both Rogers and Robert DeLeo put themselves forward as candidates if the state house speakership, held by legally embattled lawmaker Salvatore DiMasi, became vacant. When the position became available in January 2009, there was an animated competition for the position. While Rogers managed to receive backing from many state house Democrats, he ultimately conceded to DeLeo and urged lawmakers to vote for him as the house speaker.

== See also ==
- 2019–2020 Massachusetts legislature
- 2021–2022 Massachusetts legislature

Preceded by Salvatore DiMasi	Majority Leader of the Massachusetts House of Representatives; 2004–2009	Succeeded by James Vallee
Preceded by Paul R. Haley	Chairman of Ways & Means, Massachusetts House of Representatives; 2001-2005	Succeeded by Robert A. DeLeo
