= James M. Murphy =

American state legislator

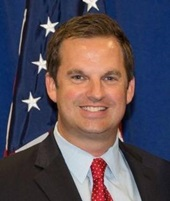

Member of the Massachusetts House of Representatives from the 4th Norfolk district
- Incumbent
- Assumed office June 27, 2001
- Preceded by: Paul R. Haley

Personal details
- Born: November 15, 1969 (age 56)
- Party: Democratic
- Education: Boston College High School; Merrimack College, B.A. Suffolk University Law School
- Occupation: Attorney

James M. Murphy (born November 15, 1969) is an American politician who represents the 4th Norfolk district in the Massachusetts House of Representatives. A member of the Democratic Party, his district includes part of the town of Weymouth.

Murphy previously served as a judicial clerk on the Massachusetts Appeals Court and as an assistant district attorney in Suffolk County.

== Political career ==
Murphy was elected to the Massachusetts House of Representatives in a special election held on May 22, 2001, defeating Republican nominee Victor Pap III.

In 2018, Murphy sponsored legislation to increase pension benefits and provide property tax relief to the widow of Michael Chesna, a Weymouth police officer who was killed in the line of duty.

=== Committee Assignments ===
- Chairperson, Joint Committee on Financial Services

== See also ==
- 2019–2020 Massachusetts legislature
- 2021–2022 Massachusetts legislature
