= George C. Miller and Son, Lithographers =

American printshop

George C. Miller and Son, Lithographers was an American lithography printshop based in New York City from 1917 to 1993 and in Chestnut Ridge, New York from 1993 to 1995.

It was founded by George C. Miller (1894–1965), who came from a family of lithographers and had previously worked for American Lithographic Company and the lithographer Bolton Brown. At that time, it was located at 3 East 14th St, New York City and offered only stone lithography.

His son, Burr Miller (1928–2017), began working in the workshop in 1948, at which point the name was changed to George C. Miller and Son.

In 1955, they relocated to a larger space at 20 W. 22nd Street, New York City and added the capability of offset lithography to the workshop.

In 1975, Burr's son Steven (1957–2020) joined the workshop, followed by his younger son Terry (b. 1959) in 1977.

The firm printed for hundreds of important American artists over its long history, including Ivan Albright, Peggy Bacon, George Bellows, Thomas Hart Benton, Charles Burchfield, Howard Cook, John Steuart Curry, Arthur B. Davies, Stuart Davis, Adolf Dehn, Mabel Dwight, Lyonel Feininger, Childe Hassam, Rockwell Kent, Yasuo Kuniyoshi, Martin Lewis, Louis Lozowick, Reginald Marsh, José Clemente Orozco, Diego Rivera, Charles Sheeler, Raphael Soyer, Grant Wood, Stow Wengenroth, and Marguerite Zorach. There were many others. They also printed for a number of publishers, including Black Sun Press, The Limited Editions Club, and The Heritage Club.
