= Paul Haley =

Paul Haley may refer to:

- Paul Haley II (born 1988), American golfer
- Paul R. Haley, member of the Massachusetts House of Representatives

== See also ==
- Paul Halley (born 1952), English keyboardist, vocalist and composer
