= Roland Worthington =

American politician

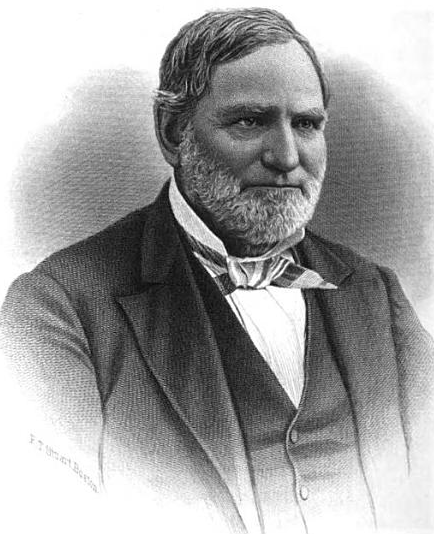

Collector of Customs for the Port of Boston
- In office 1882–1885
- Appointed by: Chester A. Arthur
- Preceded by: Alanson W. Beard
- Succeeded by: Leverett Saltonstall II

Member of the Massachusetts House of Representatives
- In office 1859
- Constituency: 4th Norfolk District

Personal details
- Born: September 22, 1817 Agawam, Massachusetts
- Died: March 20, 1898 (aged 80) Boston, Massachusetts
- Resting place: Forest Hills Cemetery
- Party: Free Soil; Republican
- Spouse: Abbie Bartlett Adams (m. 1854)
- Children: 4
- Occupation: Newspaper publisher, politician

Roland Worthington (September 22, 1817 – March 20, 1898) was an American newspaper publisher and political figure who served as publisher of the Boston Evening Traveller and Collector of Customs for the Port of Boston.

== Early life ==
Worthington was born on September 22, 1817, in Agawam, Massachusetts (then part of Springfield) to Jonathan and Fannie (Smith) Worthington. He attended public school until the age of 12, when he went to work and continued his education in various ways. In March 1837 he moved to Boston, where he worked in the counting room of the Boston Daily Advertiser. Worthington remained in the business department of the Daily Advertiser until 1843, when he moved to Europe, as it was believed the Mediterranean climate would improve his poor health. After leaving Europe, Worthington spent one winter in the southern United States before returning to Boston in June 1845. Upon his return, Worthington took control of the Boston Evening Traveller. Under Worthington's management, the Evening Traveller became the first Boston paper to employ Newspaper hawkers to sell papers in the streets rather than rely solely on subscriptions. After learning of the overthrow of Louis Philippe I in the French Revolution of 1848, the Evening Traveller became the first Boston paper to report the news, as Worthington elected to have special editions published while his competitors waited until the following day because they were subscription only. The Evening Traveller also became the first paper in Boston to use headline posters to advertise their papers. In April 1852, Worthington relocated the Evening Traveller's office from 47 Court Street to the Old State House. In 1854 the paper moved into its own building on the corner of State and Congress, which became known as the Traveller Building. Following Worthington's purchase of the building, it became known as the Worthington Building.

When Worthington joined the Republican Party, the Evening Traveller became a Republican paper. This put Worthington in conflict with his editor, Ferdinand Andrews, who supported Daniel Webster and the Cotton Whigs. Worthington replaced Andrews with twenty-two year old Manton Marble. In 1857, Samuel Bowles joined the paper. Marble and Bowles were unable to work together and Marble left for New York City. Bowles took over as managing editor on April 13, 1857, and merged the Evening Traveller with the Boston Atlas, Boston Bee, and the Independent Chronicle. The merger was a failure and placed Worthington and his partners in debt. Bowles left the paper without notice on August 10, 1857, and returned to Springfield.

== Politics ==
Worthington was one of the first members of the Free Soil Party. Throughout his association with the paper, Worthington managed the political course of the Evening Traveler. When he joined the Republican Party, the Evening Traveller became a Republican paper.

=== State and local politics ===
In 1859, Worthington represented the 4th Norfolk District in the Massachusetts House of Representatives. In 1860, the Evening Traveller was the first paper to suggest John Albion Andrew for Governor. From 1869 to 1872, Worthington served on the staff of Governor William Claflin. In 1874, Worthington was a member of the Boston Board of Aldermen.

In the 1879 gubernatorial election, the paper broke with Boston's other Republican papers and pushed for the candidacy of John Davis Long. Long went on to win the nomination and defeated Democrat Benjamin Butler. In the 1882 Massachusetts gubernatorial election, the Traveler backed William W. Crapo over Robert R. Bishop. Bishop won the nomination, but lost the election to Butler. In the 1883 gubernatorial election, the Traveler was the only paper to back George D. Robinson, as Worthington believed Robinson to be the only Republican speaker effective enough to beat Butler on the stump. Robinson won the nomination and defeated Butler.

=== National politics ===
Worthington was a supporter of Chester A. Arthur and fought back against Half-Breed attacks against Arthur following his nomination as Vice President of the United States. The Evening Traveler was very favorable towards Arthur throughout his presidency and in April 1882, Arthur nominated Worthington for the position of Collector of Customs for the Port of Boston. Worthington's nomination was opposed on political grounds by Massachusetts Senator George Frisbie Hoar, but on May 15, 1882, Worthington was confirmed by the United States Senate 38 votes to 14. Prior to the 1884 Republican National Convention, the Evening Traveler urged the New England delegates to back Arthur over James G. Blaine and George F. Edmunds, as Worthington believed Blaine could not win the general election and Edmunds was not a strong enough candidate to defeat Blaine. Worthington's predictions were correct; Edmunds was unable to defeat Blaine and Blaine went on to lose to Democrat Grover Cleveland. Worthington left the collector's office in 1885 and he returned to the Evening Traveler full time.

== Personal life and death ==
On April 26, 1854, Worthington married Abbie Bartlett Adams. They had four children (two sons and two daughters). Worthington was a member of the First Religious Society of Roxbury. He died at his home in Roxbury on March 20, 1898, and was buried at Forest Hills Cemetery.
