= 1971 Boston mayoral election =

Election in Massachusetts, United States

- November 2, 1971
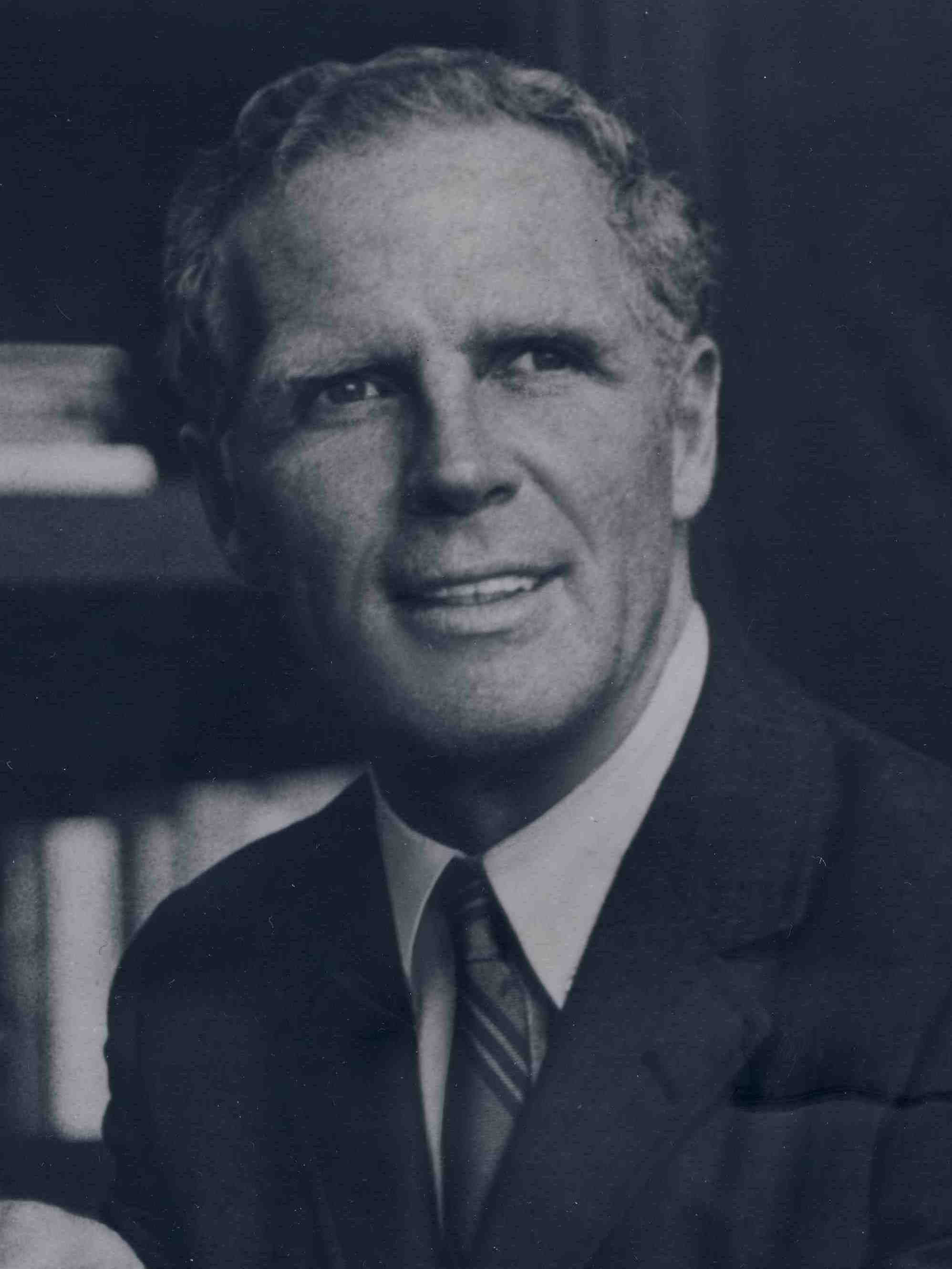

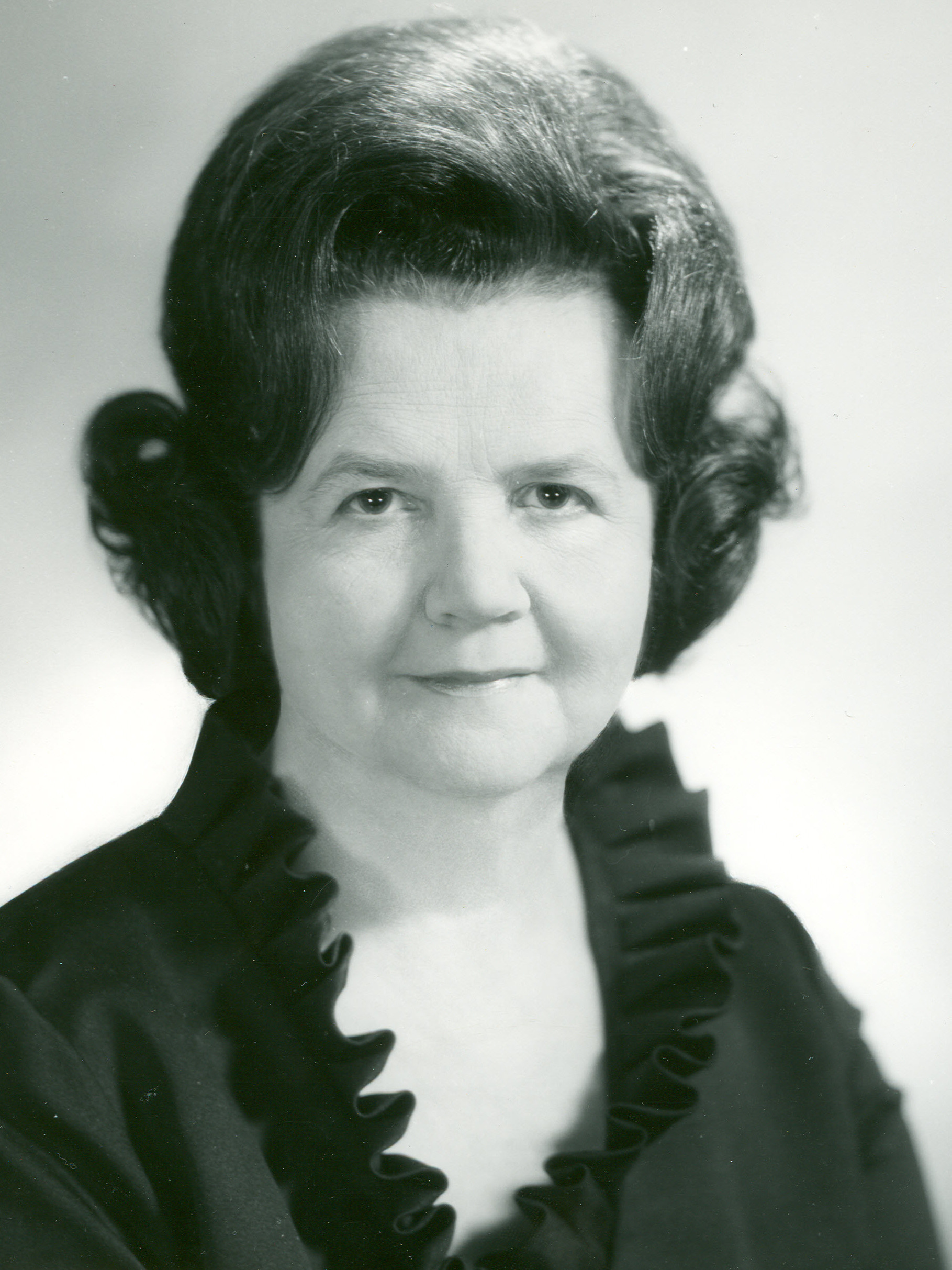
Candidate	Kevin White	Louise Day Hicks
Party	Nonpartisan	Nonpartisan
Popular vote	113,137	70,331
Percentage	61.67%	38.33%
- Results by ward White: 50–60% 60–70% 70–80% 80–90% >90% Hicks: 50–60%
Mayor before election
Kevin White
Elected mayor
Kevin White

The Boston mayoral election of 1971 was held on Tuesday, November 2, 1971, between Mayor Kevin White and United States Representative Louise Day Hicks. This was the second consecutive election between White and Hicks; White was elected to a second term, once again defeating Hicks.

The non-partisan municipal preliminary election was held on September 14, 1971.

== Candidates ==
- Louise Day Hicks, member of the United States House of Representatives since 1971. Member of the Boston City Council from 1968 to 1971. Member of the Boston School Committee from 1961 to 1967.
- Kevin White, Mayor of Boston since 1968, Massachusetts Secretary of the Commonwealth from 1961 to 1967.

=== Candidates eliminated in preliminary ===
- Thomas I. Atkins, member of the Boston City Council since 1968.
- John E. Powers, Jr.
- John L. Saltonstall, Jr., member of the Boston City Council since 1968.
- Joseph F. Timilty, member of the Boston City Council since 1968.

== Results ==
Candidates	Preliminary Election		General Election	
Candidates	Votes	%	Votes	%
Kevin White (incumbent)	46,913	32.84	113,137	61.67
Louise Day Hicks	42,293	29.61	70,331	38.33
Joseph F. Timilty	28,389	19.87		
Thomas I. Atkins	16,917	11.84		
John L. Saltonstall, Jr.	6,943	4.86		
John E. Powers, Jr.	1,392	0.97		

== See also ==
- List of mayors of Boston, Massachusetts
