= Leverett Saltonstall II =

American lawyer

Leverett Saltonstall
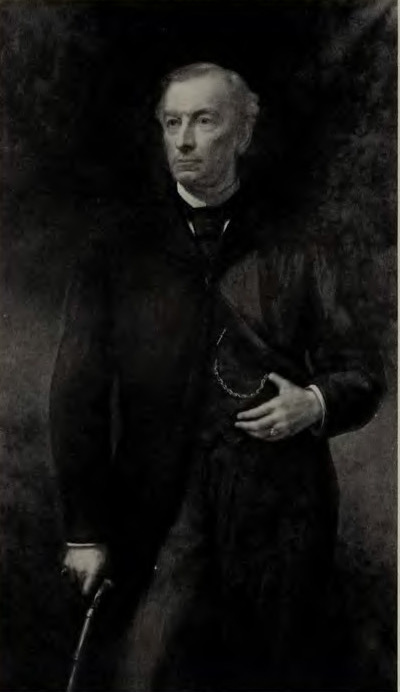
- Portrait of Saltonstall by Daniel Huntington

Collector of Customs for the Port of Boston
- In office 1885–1889
- Appointed by: Grover Cleveland
- Preceded by: Roland Worthington
- Succeeded by: Alanson W. Beard

Personal details
- Born: March 16, 1825 Salem, Massachusetts
- Died: April 16, 1895 (aged 70) Brookline, Massachusetts
- Party: Whig; Constitutional Union; Democrat
- Spouse: Rose Smith Lee (m. 1854)
- Relations: See Saltonstall family
- Children: 6, including Endicott
- Parent(s): Leverett Saltonstall I Mary Elizabeth Sanders
- Education: Harvard College; Harvard Law School

Leverett Saltonstall (March 16, 1825 – April 16, 1895) was an American political figure who served as Collector of Customs for the Port of Boston.

== Early life ==
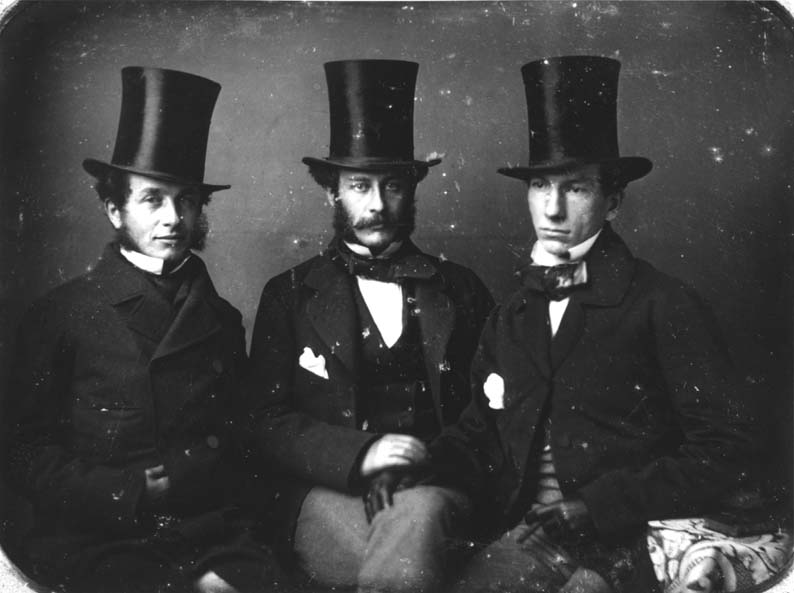
Leverett Saltonstall (right) sitting next to his Harvard classmate Charles William Dabney Jr. and an unidentified friend, c. 1850

A member of the Saltonstall family, Saltonstall was born on March 16, 1825, in Salem, Massachusetts. He was a son of Mary Elizabeth (née Sanders) Saltonstall and Leverett Saltonstall I, who served as the first mayor of Salem.

Saltonstall graduated from Harvard College in 1844 and studied law at Harvard Law School and with the firm of Sohier & Welch. He was admitted to the bar in 1850.

== Career ==
Saltonstall began his political involvement with the Whigs, his father's political party. In 1854 he was appointed to the staff of Governor Emory Washburn.

By 1860, the Whig Party had dissolved and Saltonstall disapproved of the new Republican Party. He was a founder of the Constitutional Union Party. Saltonstall served as the party's state chairman and gave up his law practice to focus on the party. In 1860 he was the nominee of the Constitutional Union and Democratic parties for the United States House of Representatives seat in the Massachusetts's 3rd congressional district, but lost to Republican Charles Francis Adams Sr. After the Constitutional Union Party disappeared, Saltonstall became a Democrat. He was the Democratic nominee in the 7th congressional district in 1866, 1868, and the 1869 special election following George S. Boutwell's appointment as United States Secretary of the Treasury. Saltonstall was a War Democrat and made speeches encouraging enlistment in the Union Army. During the 1876 presidential election, Saltonstall spoke throughout the country for Samuel J. Tilden and served as an election monitor for the Democratic Party in Florida. He disputed the Republican victory there, charging them with manipulating the results.

From 1885 to 1889, Saltonstall served as Collector of Customs for the Port of Boston under president Grover Cleveland. Saltonstall gave John F. Fitzgerald a job as a customs inspector. Fitzgerald later became Mayor of Boston and championed major improvements to the port.

== Personal life and death ==
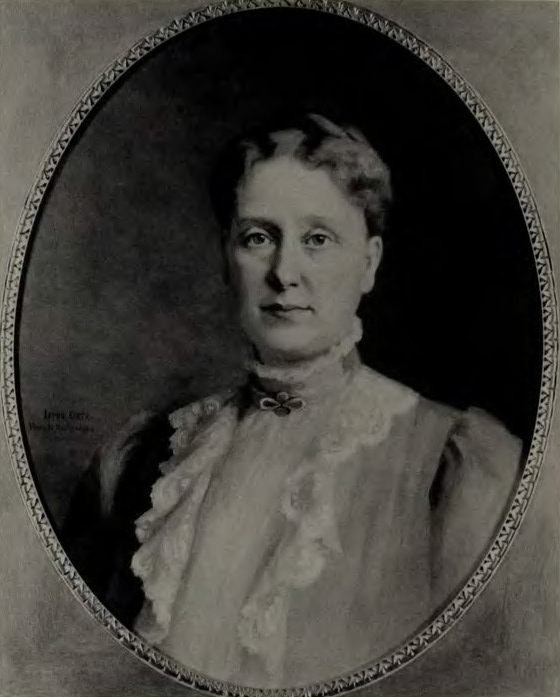
Rose Smith Lee

In 1854, Saltonstall was married to Rose Smith Lee (1835–1903), a daughter of John Clarke Lee. Together, they were the parents of four sons and two daughters.

- Leverett Saltonstall III (1855–1863), who died young.
- Richard Middlecott "Dick" Saltonstall (1859–1922), who married Eleanor Brooks, a great-daughter of Peter Chardon Brooks, in 1891.
- Rose Lee Saltonstall (1861–1891), who married Dr. George Webb West, son of George West, in 1884.
- Mary Elizabeth Saltonstall (1862–1947), who married Louis Agassiz Shaw, son of Quincy Adams Shaw and brother to Robert Gould Shaw II, in 1884. After his death in 1891, she married John S. Curtis.
- Philip Leverett Saltonstall (1867–1919), a banker who married Frances Anne Fitch Sherwood, daughter of Thomas Dubois Sherwood, in 1890. After his death, she married Dr. Joel Ernest Goldthwait.
- Endicott Peabody Saltonstall (1872–1922), who married Elizabeth Baldwin Dupee, a daughter of William Richardson Dupee, in 1898.

Saltonstall died on April 16, 1895, at his home in Chestnut Hill in Brookline, Massachusetts. In his will, he left $5,000 (~$163,385 in 2024) to establish a scholarship for "meritorious students" at Harvard.

=== Descendants ===
Through his son Richard, he was a grandfather of Massachusetts Governor and United States Senator Leverett Saltonstall.

Through his daughter Mary Elizabeth, he was a grandfather of Louis Agassiz Shaw Jr., a Harvard physiologist who is credited in 1928, along with Philip Drinker, for inventing the Drinker respirator, the first widely used iron lung.

Through his youngest son Endicott, he was a grandfather of art teacher Elizabeth Saltonstall.

Government offices
Preceded by Roland Worthington	Collector of Customs for the Port of Boston; 1885–1889	Succeeded by Alanson W. Beard
