= Thomas I. Atkins =

American politician

Thomas Irving Atkins (March 2, 1939 – June 27, 2008) was an American attorney and politician who served as a member of the Boston City Council and General Counsel of the NAACP.

== Early life ==
Atkins was born on March 2, 1939, in Elkhart, Indiana to a Pentecostal minister and a domestic worker. As a child, he overcame a bout of polio. He was the first black student body president at Elkhart High School.

In 1960, he was elected student body president at Indiana University Bloomington. He was the school's first African American student body president as well as the first African American student body president in the Big Ten. That same year he married Sharon Soash, a 1960 graduate of Indiana University who served as his campaign manager when he ran for student body president. The couple had to marry in Michigan because Indiana prohibited interracial marriage. Atkins graduated from Indiana in 1961 with a bachelor's degree in political science. In 1963 he earned a master's in Middle Eastern studies from Harvard University. In 1969 he graduated from Harvard Law School.

While at Harvard, Atkins served as executive secretary of Boston's NAACP office. During the mid-1960s, he also hosted a Saturday talk show on Boston's Black radio station, WILD, where he discussed current events that affected the Black community. His co-host was Lovell Dyett, who later went on to become a talk show host on WBZ Radio.

== Politics ==
Atkins was first elected to the Boston City Council in 1967, becoming the first Black elected to the position. The day following the Assassination of Martin Luther King Jr., Atkins convinced Mayor Kevin White not to cancel a James Brown concert that was to be held that evening at the Boston Garden and helped negotiate an agreement between White and Brown to have the concert televised by WGBH-TV. White and Atkins hoped that televising the concert would keep angry and frustrated teenagers at home and prevent the looting and rioting that was occurring in other cities. The concert has been credited with preventing riots from breaking out in Boston.

In 1971, Atkins ran for Mayor of Boston. He finished in fourth place with 11 percent of the vote.

On October 26, 1971, Atkins was appointed Secretary of Communities and Development by Governor Francis W. Sargent. He was sworn in on November 1, 1971, becoming the first African-American to serve as a state Cabinet Secretary.

== Legal career and NAACP ==
Atkins served as associate trial counsel for the plaintiffs in Morgan v. Hennigan.

On July 16, 1974, Atkins was named interim president of the Boston branch of the National Association for the Advancement of Colored People. He was elected to a full two-year term on December 18, 1974. As a Boston's NAACP President, Atkins was a central figure during contentious battle over desegregation busing in Boston.

In addition to serving as President of the Boston branch, Atkins was also the NAACP's chief desegregation counsel nationally. In this capacity he was the chief counsel in organization's desegregation lawsuits in Youngstown, Ohio, Columbus, Ohio, San Francisco, Cleveland, and Milwaukee

In 1980, he succeeded Nathaniel R. Jones as general counsel of the NAACP. In 1983, Atkins was named executive director of the NAACP by Chairperson Margaret Bush Wilson. However, the organization's board of directors sided with suspended executive director Benjamin Hooks and Hooks was reinstated. Atkins resigned as counsel in 1984 to return to private law practice.

== Later life ==
Atkins and his wife separated in 1984. They would divorce four years later.

Atkins died in Brooklyn on June 27, 2008, from complications from Amyotrophic lateral sclerosis.

Political offices
Preceded by Position created	Massachusetts Secretary of Communities and Development; 1971–1975	Succeeded by William Flynn
