= Alanson W. Beard =

American politician

Alanson Wilder Beard
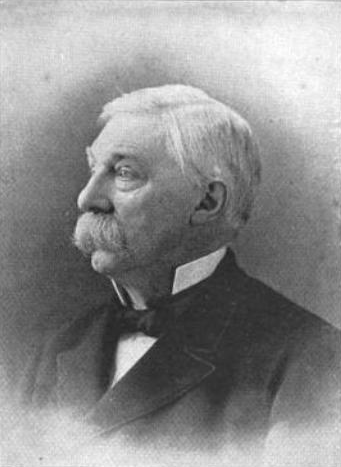

Massachusetts Treasurer
- In office 1886–1889
- Governor: George D. Robinson; Oliver Ames
- Preceded by: Daniel A. Gleason
- Succeeded by: George A. Marden

Chairperson of the Massachusetts Republican Party
- In office 1885–1886
- Preceded by: Edward Avery
- Succeeded by: J. Henry Gould
- In office 1876–1878
- Preceded by: George B. Loring
- Succeeded by: Adin Thayer

Member of the Massachusetts House of Representatives
- In office 1884–1885

Collector of Customs at the Port of Boston
- In office 1890–1894
- Appointed by: Benjamin Harrison
- Preceded by: Leverett Saltonstall
- Succeeded by: Winslow Warren
- In office 1878–1882
- Appointed by: Rutherford B. Hayes
- Preceded by: William A. Simmons
- Succeeded by: Roland Worthington

Member of the Massachusetts House of Representatives
- In office 1870–1871

Personal details
- Born: August 20, 1825 Ludlow, Vermont, U.S.
- Died: August 27, 1900 (aged 75) Boston, Massachusetts, U.S.
- Party: Republican
- Children: Charles Beard
- Occupation: Clothing merchant

Alanson Wilder Beard (August 20, 1825 – August 27, 1900) was an American who served as a member of the Massachusetts House of Representatives, as Collector of Customs at the Port of Boston and as the Treasurer of Massachusetts.

== Early life ==
Beard was born to the son of James and Chloe Bartlett (Wilder) Beard on August 20, 1825, in Ludlow, Vermont.

== Bibliography ==
- Andrews, Geo. F.: Commonwealth of Massachusetts Official Gazette State Government page 17, (1886).
- Boston Daily Globe A. W. BEARD DEAD. Twice Collector of the Port of Boston. Prominent in Civil Service Reform Movement. Born in Vermont and in Youth Taught School. Kept Country Store and Then Came to Boston. Leader in Republican Party for Many Years. page 1. (Aug 28, 1900).
