= Edith Flack Ackley =

American doll maker and designer (1887–1970)

- Born: Edith Flack; June 6, 1887; Greenport, New York, U.S.
- Died: November 28, 1970 (aged 83)

Edith Flack Ackley Wengenroth (6 June 1887 – 28 November 1970) was an American writer, doll maker, and designer.

She was born in Greenport, New York. She made her first dolls for her daughter, Telka. When her daughter was older, she made water color paintings that were portraits of Ackley's dolls. Ackley went on to make dolls as a source of income, and had her own doll shop. Ackley's dolls have been shown in the Wenham Museum and the Children's Museum of Cleveland.

== Books ==
- Ackley, Edith Flack (1939). Paper dolls: Their history and how to make them. Frederick A. Stokes Company.
- Ackley, Edith Flack (1941). A Doll Shop of Your Own (First ed.). Frederick A. Stokes.
- Ackley, Edith Flack (1929). Marionettes: Easy to Make! Fun to Use!. University of Alberta Libraries. New York, Frederick A. Stokes company.
- Ackley, Edith Flack (1951). Dolls to make for fun and profit. Lippincott.
- Ackley, Edith Flack (1940). Holiday Cards for You to Make (2nd ed.). J. B. Lippincott Company.

== Personal life ==
Her first husband, Floyd Ackley, was a jewelry designer. Her second husband was the artist Stow Wengenroth, whom she married in 1936.
