= Saltonstall family =

Massachusetts family

Coat of arms of the Saltonstall family

The Saltonstall family is a Boston Brahmin family from the U.S. state of Massachusetts, notable for having had a family member attend Harvard University from every generation since Nathaniel Saltonstall—later one of the more principled judges at the Salem Witch Trials—graduated in 1659.

== History ==
The Saltonstall family originated in Yorkshire, England, where the name was sometimes spelled Saltingstall. The name originates from the hamlet of Saltonstall in Halifax, West Yorkshire. The meaning is derived from Sal-ton-stall in Old English, the translation being "Farm in the Willows". The English ancestors of the Boston Saltonstalls were prosperous merchants.

In Harvard University's Leverett House Library, there exists a commemorative wooden plaque dedicating the reading room of the library to "ten generations of Saltonstalls, who have matriculated at Harvard 1642–1959."

At Phillips Exeter Academy, there exists a boathouse erected in William G. Saltonstall's honor.

== Notable members ==
- Richard Saltonstall (1521–1601), MP and Lord Mayor of London
- Sir Richard Saltonstall, colonist with the Winthrop Fleet, nephew of the above
- Nathaniel Saltonstall, judge at Salem Witch Trials
- Gurdon Saltonstall, his son, governor of Connecticut
- Gurdon Saltonstall Mumford, his great-grandson, U.S. Representative from New York
- Dudley Saltonstall, commander at Penobscot Expedition
- Leverett Saltonstall I, U.S. Representative in 1830s
- Leverett Saltonstall II, his son, Collector of the Port of Boston (1885–1889)
- Endicott Peabody Saltonstall, his son, district attorney of Middlesex County, Massachusetts (1921–1922)
- Elizabeth Saltonstall, his daughter, an artist
- Leverett A. Saltonstall, grandson of Leverett Saltonstall II, Governor of Massachusetts (1939–1945), U.S. Senator (1945–1967)
- William L. Saltonstall, his son, state senator (1967–1979)
- William G. Saltonstall, principal, Phillips Exeter Academy, 1946–1963
- John L. Saltonstall Jr., politician

== Family tree ==
- Richard Saltonstall (c. 1470–1524) m. Isabel
  - John Saltonstall (c. 1492–1559)
    - Gilbert Saltonstall (1525–1598) m. Isabel Ashton (d. 1573)
      - Samuel Saltonstall (1560–1612) m. (1) Anne Ramsden (1564–1611); (2) Elizabeth Ogden; (3) Elizabeth (née Bennington) Armine
        - Sir Richard Saltonstall (1586–1661) m. c. 1609 (1) Grace Kaye (d. 1625); m. (2) Lady Elizabeth West
          - Richard Saltonstall (1610–1694) m. Muriel Gurdon (1613–1688)
            - Nathaniel Saltonstall (1639–1707) m. Elizabeth Ward (1647–1714)
              - Gurdon Saltonstall (1666–1724) m. bef 16 Jun 1680 (1) Jerusha Richards (1665-1697); m. 1702 (2) Elizabeth Rosewell (1679–1710); m. c. 1711 (3) Mary Whittinghame (d. 1730)
                - Elizabeth Saltonstall (1690–1736) m. 1710 (1) Richard Christophers (1685–1736); m. (2) Isaac Ledyard
                - Sarah Saltonstall (b. 1694) m. 1715 (1) John Gardiner (1692–1725); m. 1727 (2) Samuel Davis (1692–1733)
                - Rosewell Saltonstall (1701–1738) m. 1727 Mary Haynes (1703–1769)
                - Katherine Saltonstall (b. 1704) m. 1727 William Brattle (1706–1776)
                - Nathaniel Saltonstall (1707–1748) m. 1733 Lucretia Arnold (1706–1770)
                - Gurdon Saltonstall Jr. (1708–1785) m. Rebecca Winthrop (1712–1776)
                  - Rebecca Winthrop Saltonstall (1734–1812) m. David Mumford (1730–1807)
                    - Gurdon Saltonstall Mumford (1764–1831) m. 1793 (1) Anna Van Zandt; m. 1810 (2) Letitia Van Toren
                  - Winthrop Saltonstall (1737–1811) m. Ann Wanton
                  - Dudley Saltonstall (1738–1796) m. 1765: Frances Babcock
              - Elizabeth Saltonstall (1668–1726) m. Rev. Roland Cotton
              - Col. Richard Saltonstall (1672–1714) m. Mehitabel Wainwright
                - Richard Saltonstall Jr. (1703–1756) m. c. 1726 (1) Abigail Waldron; m. 1738: (2) Mary Jekyll; m. 1744: (3) Mary Cooke
                  - Nathaniel Saltonstall (1746–1815) m. 1780: Anna White
                    - Leverett Saltonstall I (1783–1845) m. Mary Elizabeth Sanders
                      - Leverett Saltonstall II (1825–1895) m. 1854: Rose Smith Lee (1835–1903)
                        - Richard Middlecott Saltonstall (1859–1922) m. Eleanor Brooks
                          - Leverett Saltonstall (1892–1979) m. 1916: Alice Wesselhoeft (1893–1981)
                            - William Lawrence Saltonstall (1927–2009) m. 1953: Jane Chandler
                        - Mary Elizabeth Saltonstall (1862–1947) m. (1) Louis Agassiz Shaw; m. (2) John S. Curtis
                          - Louis Agassiz Shaw Jr. (1886–1940) m. Joanne Bird
                        - Philip Leverett Saltonstall (1867–1919) m. 1890: Frances Anne Fitch Sherwood
                          - Rose Lee Saltsonstall (1892–1946) m. 1923: William Chapman Potter
                        - Endicott Peabody Saltonstall (1872–1922) m. Elizabeth Baldwin Dupee
                          - Elizabeth Saltonstall (1900–1990)
                    - Nathaniel Saltonstall II (1784–1838) m. 1820 Caroline Saunders
                      - William Gurdon Saltonstall (1831–1889) m. 1816: Josephine Lee
                        - Robert Saltonstall (1870–1938) m. 1904 Caroline James Stevenson
                          - William Gurdon Saltonstall (1905–1989) m. Katharyn Saltonstall
                        - Lucy Sanders Saltonstall (1871–1940) m. Neal Rantoul (1870–1934)
                        - John Lee Saltonstall (1878–1959) m. (1) Margaret Auchmuty Tucker; (2) Gladys Durant Rice
                          - John Lee Saltonstall Jr. (1916–2007) m. (1) Margaret Louise Bonnell; m. 1976: (2) Adriana Gianturco
                        - Rosamond Saltonstall (1881–1953) m. Charles Crooke Auchincloss (1881–1961)
                          - Rosamond Saltonstall Auchincloss (1907–1971) m. Burton James Lee II (1907–1962)
                            - Burton James Lee III (1930–2016) m. 1953: Pauline Herzog
                          - Richard Saltonstall Auchincloss (1909–1990) m. Mary King Wainwright (1911–2008)
                          - Josephine Lee Auchincloss (1912–2005) m. Benjamin Carlton Betner Jr.; m. (2) Harry Ingersoll Nicholas III
              - Nathaniel Saltonstall (1674–1739), m. Dorothy Frizel
  - Gilbert Saltonstall (1493–1545) m. Agnes
    - Richard Saltonstall (1521–1601) m. Suzanna Poyntz
      - Eleanor Saltonstall (1554–c. 1601) m. (1) Vincent Harvie; m. (2) Robert Myddelton
      - Hester Saltonstall (1555–1587) m. Sir Thomas Myddelton
        - Sir Thomas Myddelton m. (1) Margaret Savile; m. (2) Mary Napier
          - Sir Thomas Myddelton, 1st Baronet (1624–1663) m. (1) Mary Cholmondley; m. (2) Jane Trevor
          - Ann Myddelton (dsp. c. 1660) m. Edward Herbert, 3rd Baron Herbert of Chirbury
      - Elizabeth Saltonstall (1556–1626) m. c. 1583 Richard Wyche (1554–1621)
        - Sir Peter Wyche (c. 1593–1643) m. Jane Meredith
        - Nathaniel Wyche (1607–1659) m. 1657 Anne (née Cranmer) Slane
      - Gilbert Saltonstall m. Anne Harleston
      - Richard Saltonstall m. Jane Barnard
      - Peter Saltonstall (1577–1651) m. (1) Christian Pettus (d. 1646); m. (2) Anne Waller

== See also ==
- Saltonstall Plantation, now Watertown, Massachusetts
- Myddelton family
