= Nathaniel Saltonstall =

Massachusetts judge during Salem witch trials

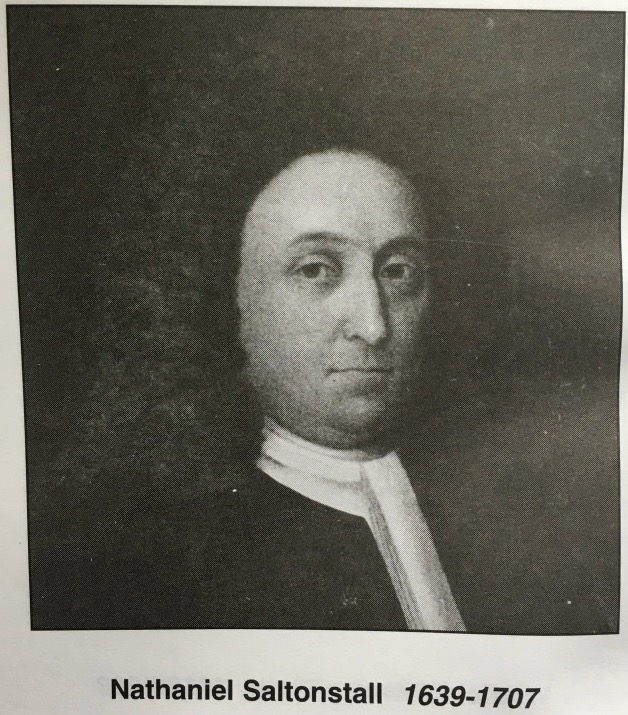
- Portrait of Nathaniel Saltonstall
- Born: c. 1639; Ipswich, Massachusetts
- Died: May 21, 1707 (aged 67–68); Haverhill, Massachusetts
- Education: Harvard College
- Occupations: Judge, public official
- Spouse: Elizabeth Ward (after 1663)
- Relatives: Saltonstall family

Col. Nathaniel Saltonstall (Note: Also spelled Nathanial Saltonstall, Nathanael Saltonstall, or Nathanael Saltonſtall.) c. 1639 – May 21, 1707 was a judge for the Court of Oyer and Terminer, a special court established in 1692 for the trial and sentence of people, mostly women, for the crime of witchcraft in the Province of Massachusetts Bay during the Salem Witch Trials. He is most famous for his resignation from the court, and though he left no indication of his feelings toward witchcraft, he is considered to be one of the more principled men of his time.

== Early life ==
Saltonstall was born in Ipswich, Massachusetts, in about 1639, to Richard Saltonstall (1610–1694) and Murial (née Gurdon) Saltonstall (1613–1688), a daughter of Brampton Gurdon. He was the grandson of Sir Richard Saltonstall who led a group of English settlers up the Charles River to settle in what is now Watertown, Massachusetts, in 1630. His grandfather was a nephew of Richard Saltonstall, the Lord Mayor of London.

He graduated from Harvard College in 1659, beginning the family tradition of higher education at this university.

== Career ==
In 1668, Saltonstall began his career in town affairs when he was appointed town clerk. Robert Moody quotes that, according to a single surviving record book, he was "firm and effective in law enforcement, and yet, where allowed discretion by law, humane and flexible".

During King Philip's War, Saltonstall sent progress reports of the war to London.

His involvement in judicial affairs and apparent good reputation made him eligible to serve in the Salem Witch Trials, and he was appointed a judge along with six other men on May 27, 1692. There is no evidence, however, of his attendance at any of the examinations. Indeed, he resigned from the Court of Oyer and Terminer around June 8, 1692, the same time as Bridget Bishop's trial and sentence for witchcraft. Presumably, he was "displeased with the handling of the Bishop case", and for some time afterward remained "very much dissatisfied with the proceedings".

In addition to town judiciary service, he was a member of the local militia, responsible in part for frontier defense against Native Americans, and he reached the rank of colonel.

== Personal life ==
Coat of Arms of Nathaniel Saltonstall

On December 29, 1663, he wed Elizabeth Ward (1647–1714), who was 18 years old, and acquired from her father, John Ward, the estate later known as the Saltonstall Seat. Among their children were:

- Gurdon Saltonstall (1666–1724), later the governor of Connecticut.
- Elizabeth Saltonstall (1668–1726), who married Rev. Roland Cotton.
- Col. Richard Saltonstall (1672–1714), who married Mehitabel Wainwright.
- Nathaniel Saltonstall (1674–1739), who married Dorothy Frizel.

Saltonstall died on May 21, 1707, in Haverhill, Massachusetts, at around 68 years of age.
