= William L. Saltonstall =

American politician

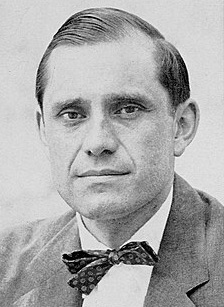
- Saltonstall c. 1967

Member of the Massachusetts Senate
- In office 1967–1979
- Preceded by: Philip A. Graham
- Succeeded by: Robert C. Buell
- Constituency: 3rd Essex (1967–75); 1st Essex and Middlesex (1975–79)

Personal details
- Born: May 14, 1927 Chestnut Hill, Massachusetts
- Died: January 23, 2009 (aged 81) Manchester-by-the-Sea, Massachusetts
- Party: Republican
- Education: Harvard College; Harvard Business School
- Occupation: Security Analyst; Congressional aide Politician

William Lawrence Saltonstall (May 14, 1927 – January 23, 2009), an American politician, was a member of the Massachusetts Senate from 1967 to 1979. He was a Republican and a resident of Manchester-by-the-Sea, Massachusetts. He led an unsuccessful campaign in 1969 to represent Massachusetts's 6th congressional district in the U.S. House of Representatives.

== Early life ==
Born in Chestnut Hill, Massachusetts, he was a son of Leverett Saltonstall (1892–1979), a Massachusetts governor and a U.S. senator. He was a member of the Saltonstall family, a Boston Brahmin family from the U.S. state of Massachusetts, notable for having had a family member attend Harvard University from every generation since 1659 when Nathaniel Saltonstall graduated, who later served as one of the judges at the Salem Witch Trials. The family traces its wealth back to the East India Company and political connections to the Lord Mayor of London in the 16th century. Upon migrating to England's North American colonies the family established strong political roots in Massachusetts.

While the Saltonstall men were known to join the U.S. Army, he instead enlisted the U.S. Navy on his eighteenth birthday. His first day of service was V-J Day in 1945. With World War II at its end, Saltonstall enrolled at Harvard College, from which he graduated in 1949. He later graduated from Harvard Business School.

== Career ==
Saltonstall (left) campaigning in Haverhill for the U.S. Congress in 1969 alongside Governor Francis W. Sargent (right)

After working as a security analyst for seven years, Saltonstall worked at his father's U.S. Senate office in Washington, D.C. He returned to Massachusetts in 1966 where he ran for the state Senate. He won, and went on to represent the Third Essex district from 1967 to 1975 and the First Essex and Middlesex district from 1975 to 1979. One of his top priorities was bicycle safety due to the death of his daughter, Claire. Saltonstall ran for the U.S. House in a 1969 special election to succeed the deceased William H. Bates from the 6th Massachusetts district, but lost to Democrat Michael J. Harrington.

Saltonstall chose to leave politics citing "family issues," but news reports at the time suggested Mr. Saltonstall chose to exit the public stage so he would not be required to disclose details of the family's trust, which would have been required under newly passed ethics legislation.

== Personal life ==
Saltonstall married Jane Chandler in 1953. They had three children, Abigail, Claire, and William, Jr. Claire was struck and killed by an automobile driver in 1974 while she was riding her bicycle. The Claire Saltonstall Bikeway from Boston's Emerald Necklace to Provincetown is named in her memory.

On a Friday evening in January 2009, after returning home from dinner with his wife, Saltonstall died "of an apparent heart attack or blood clot".
