= James C. Auchincloss =

American businessman and politician (1885–1976)

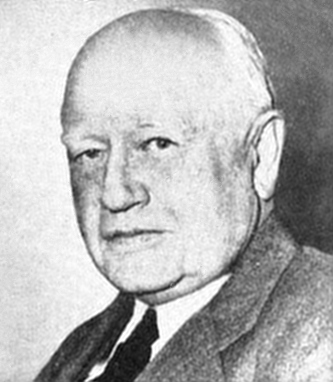
- Auchincloss c. 1963

Member of the U.S. House of Representatives from New Jersey's 3rd district
- In office January 3, 1943 – January 3, 1965
- Preceded by: William H. Sutphin
- Succeeded by: James J. Howard

7th Mayor of Rumson
- In office 1938–1942
- Preceded by: Neilson Edwards
- Succeeded by: Louis M. Hague

Personal details
- Born: James Coats Auchincloss; January 19, 1885 Manhattan, New York City
- Died: October 2, 1976 (aged 91) Alexandria, Virginia
- Party: Republican
- Spouses: Lee Alexander (m. 1909; died 1959) Vera Rogers Brown (m. 1960)
- Children: 2
- Relatives: Charles C. Auchincloss (brother); Hugh D. Auchincloss (cousin); Stuart Coats (cousin)
- Education: Cutler School; Groton School
- Alma mater: Yale University (1908)
- Profession: Stock broker, politician

James Coats Auchincloss (January 19, 1885 – October 2, 1976) was an American businessman and Republican Party politician who represented northern coastal region of New Jersey in the United States House of Representatives from 1943–1965. His district consisted of Monmouth County, Ocean County, and the part of Middlesex County south of the Raritan River. (Note: The Middlesex County portion of his district was removed during his final two years in office.)

== Early life ==
Auchincloss was born in Manhattan, New York City on January 19, 1885. He was one of eight children, seven sons and one daughter, born to Edgar Stirling Auchincloss (1847–1892) and Maria LeGrange (née Sloan) Auchincloss (1847–1929), who married in 1872. Among his siblings was lawyer and stockbroker Charles C. Auchincloss.

Among his uncles were Hugh Dudley Auchincloss (father of Hugh D. Auchincloss, Jr.) and John Winthrop Auchincloss (grandfather of Louis Auchincloss). His maternal aunt Sarah Auchincloss (d. 1887) married Sir James Coats, 1st Baronet of the Scottish thread-manufacturing family (and his namesake), and they were the parents of Sir Stuart Coats, 2nd Baronet and British Member of Parliament. His maternal grandparents were Mary (née Elmendorf) Sloan and New York State Senator Samuel Sloan, who served as president of the Delaware, Lackawanna and Western Railroad for 26 years.

He attended the Cutler School in Manhattan, New York City; and Groton School in Groton, Massachusetts. He graduated from Yale University in 1908.

== Career ==
From 1908 until 1940, he engaged in financial and stock brokerage business with Auchincloss, Joost & Company located at 60 Broadway in New York City. He was a governor of the New York Stock Exchange from 1921 to 1938 (after buying his seat on the Exchange on January 27, 1910, for $92,000, the highest price paid up to that time). He was also the founder, treasurer, president, and chairman of the board of the New York Better Business Bureau.

From 1909 to 1913, Auchincloss served in the Seventh Regiment of the New York National Guard and as Deputy Police Commissioner of New York City. During World War I, he served as captain, Military Intelligence.

=== Political career ===
He was a member of the Rumson, New Jersey, borough council from 1930 to 1937, and served as the borough's mayor from 1938 to 1943.

Auchincloss was elected as a Republican to the Seventy-eighth United States Congress, as well as the ten succeeding Congresses serving from January 3, 1943, until January 3, 1965. Auchincloss voted in favor of the Civil Rights Acts of 1957, 1960, and 1964, as well as the 24th Amendment to the U.S. Constitution. He was not a candidate for reelection in 1964 to the Eighty-ninth Congress. While in Congress, he founded the Capitol Hill Club in Washington, D.C., in 1951.

== Personal life ==
On October 23, 1909, he was married to Lee Frances Alexander (1888–1959) by the Rev. Dr. Endicott Peabody at the Chapel of the Intercession in New York. Lee, a 1909 graduate of Barnard College, was a daughter of Dr. Welcome T. Alexander and Aimee G. (née Thayer) Alexander. Together, they resided at various residences, including first at 772 Park Avenue in New York and then in Rumson, New Jersey, and were the parents of:

- James Douglas Auchincloss (1913–2000), who married Lily van Ameringen (1922–1996) in 1956. They divorced in 1979.
- Gordon Auchincloss (1917–1998), who became a writer, director and communications executive.

After her death in 1959, he married Vera Rogers Brown, a daughter of Dr. and Mrs. David T. Brown of Chicago, on November 18, 1960.

He died at a nursing home in Alexandria, Virginia, on October 2, 1976, aged 91. After a funeral service at the Fifth Avenue Presbyterian Church, he was interred in Woodlawn Cemetery, the Bronx, New York City.

== See also ==
- Hugh D. Auchincloss

== Notes ==
U.S. House of Representatives
| Preceded by William; Halstead Sutphin | U.S. House of Representatives, New Jersey 3rd District; 1943–1965 | Succeeded by James; J. Howard |
