= Elizabeth Saltonstall =

American painter

Elizabeth Saltonstall (born Chestnut Hill, Massachusetts, July 26, 1900; died there May 10, 1990) was an American artist who used stone lithography and painting to depict the natural world, particularly that of her summer home of Nantucket.

Saltonstall was a member of the Saltonstall family, a Boston Brahmin family which had been prominent in Massachusetts since colonial days. Her first cousin Leverett Saltonstall served as governor and U.S. senator, and her father Endicott Peabody Saltonstall (1872-1922) was a district attorney. She studied at the School of the Museum of Fine Arts under William Merritt Chase and later studied lithography in Maine with Stow Wengenroth. In 1922 she came to Nantucket to study with painter Frank Swift Chase, and she spent all but one summer after that on the island. Saltonstall taught painting to girls at Milton Academy for 37 years, retiring in 1965.

Saltonstall became known for her lithographs of flowers, shells, mushrooms, and other objects, as well as for her landscapes. She had exhibits at the Brooklyn Museum, the National Academy of Design, the Carnegie Institute, and the National Association of Women Artists. Works by her are in the collection of the National Gallery of Art. She was an important member of the Nantucket art colony, a founding member of the Artists Association of Nantucket, the Boston Society of Independent Artists, and the Boston Printmakers.
