= Lake Saltonstall =

Lake Saltonstall may refer to:

- Lake Saltonstall (Connecticut), in south-central Connecticut
- Lake Saltonstall (Massachusetts), in Haverhill, Massachusetts
