= Massachusetts House of Representatives' 4th Norfolk district =

American legislative district

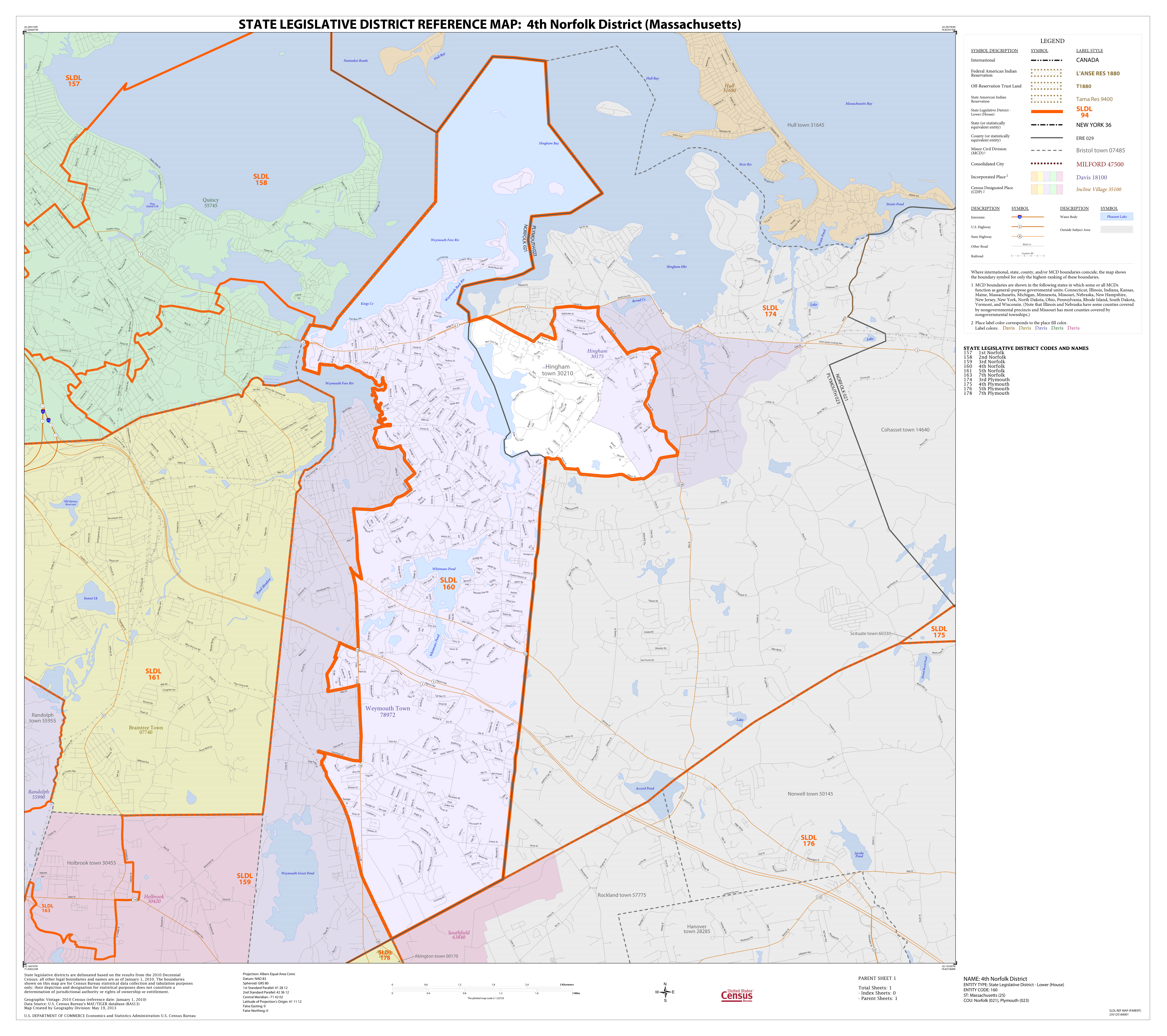
Map of Massachusetts House of Representatives' 4th Norfolk district, based on the 2010 United States census.

Massachusetts House of Representatives' 4th Norfolk district in the United States is one of 160 legislative districts included in the lower house of the Massachusetts General Court. It covers parts of Norfolk County and Plymouth County. Democrat James Murphy of Weymouth has represented the district since 2001. Candidates for this district seat in the 2020 Massachusetts general election are Paul Rotondo and incumbent James Murphy.

== Towns represented ==
The district includes the following localities:

- part of Hingham
- part of Weymouth

The current district geographic boundary overlaps with that of the Massachusetts Senate's Plymouth and Norfolk district.

=== Former locales ===
The district previously covered:

- part of Quincy, circa 1927
- part of Roxbury, circa 1872

== Representatives ==
- James Guild, circa 1858
- Samuel Walker, circa 1858
- Henry Willis, circa 1858
- Charles W. Bryant, circa 1859
- Robert C. Nichols, circa 1859
- Roland Worthington, 1859
- Albert A. Brackett, circa 1888
- Talbot Aldrich, circa 1920
- Josiah Babcock, circa 1951
- Roy C. Smith, circa 1951
- Robert B. Ambler, 1965-1991
- William D. Delahunt, circa 1975
- James M. Murphy, 2001-current

== See also ==
- List of Massachusetts House of Representatives elections
- Other Norfolk County districts of the Massachusetts House of Representatives: 1st, 2nd, 3rd, 5th, 6th, 7th, 8th, 9th, 10th, 11th, 12th, 13th, 14th, 15th
- List of Massachusetts General Courts
- List of former districts of the Massachusetts House of Representatives

== Images ==
Portraits of legislators

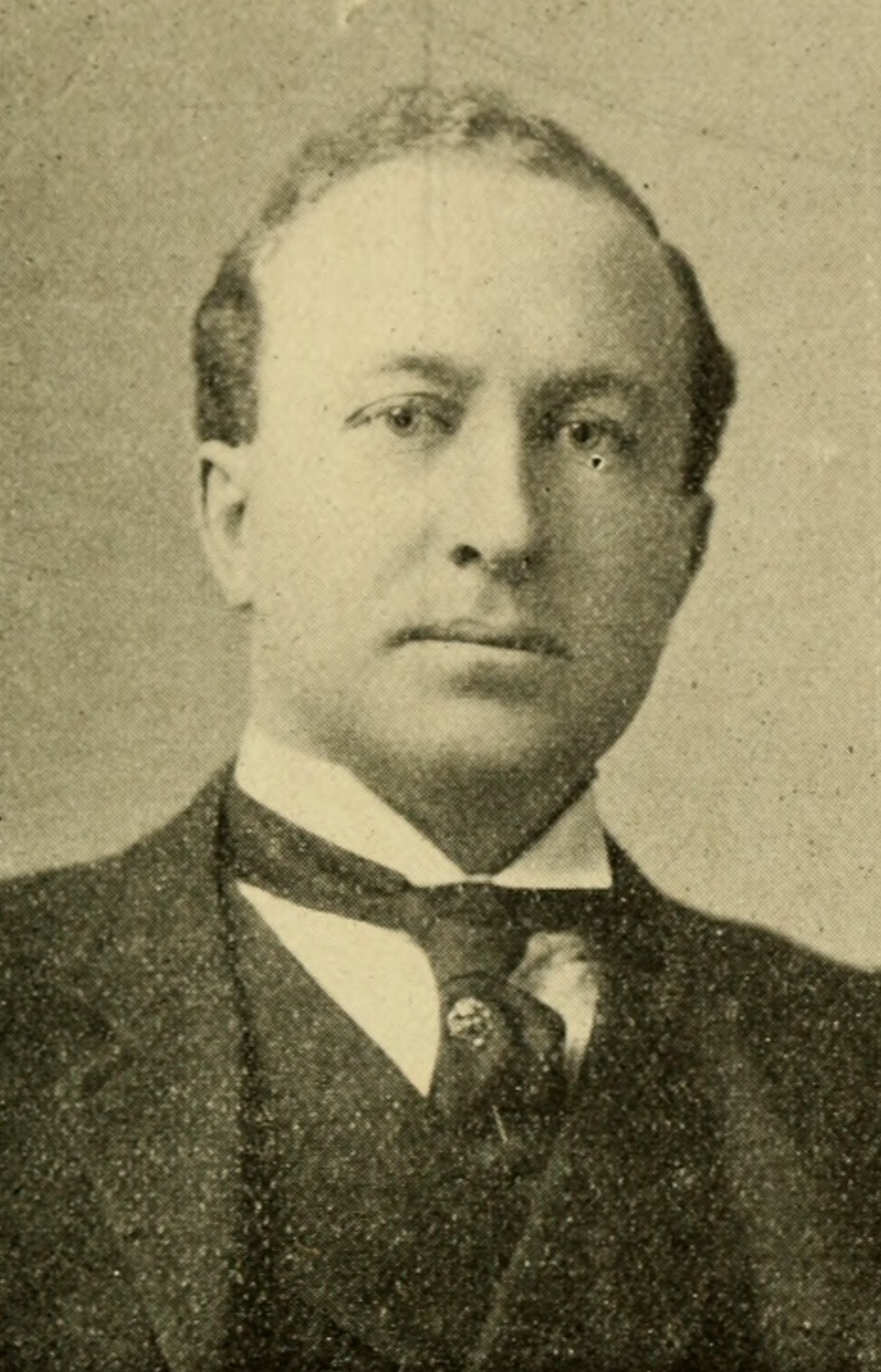
Edward Draper

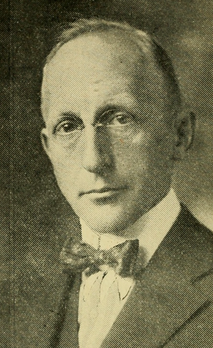
Benjamin Franklin White

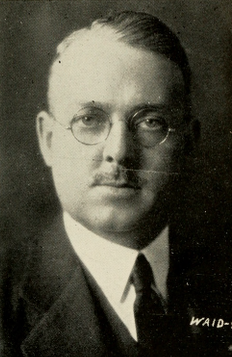
Arthur Burgess

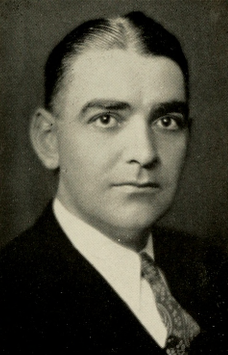
Charles Hedges

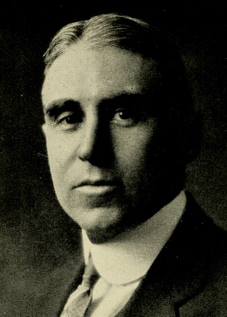
Josiah Babcock

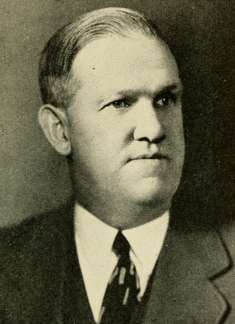
Roy Smith

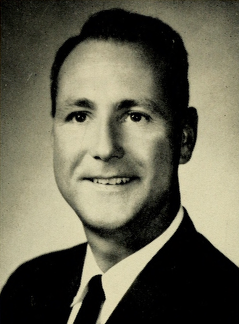
Robert Ambler

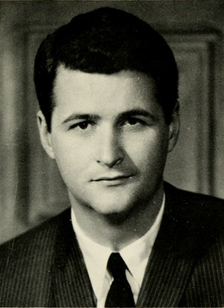
William Delahunt

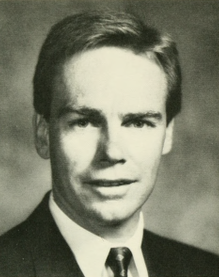
Paul Haley

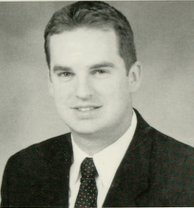
James Murphy
