= Gurdon Saltonstall =

Governor of the Colony of Connecticut from 1708 to 1724

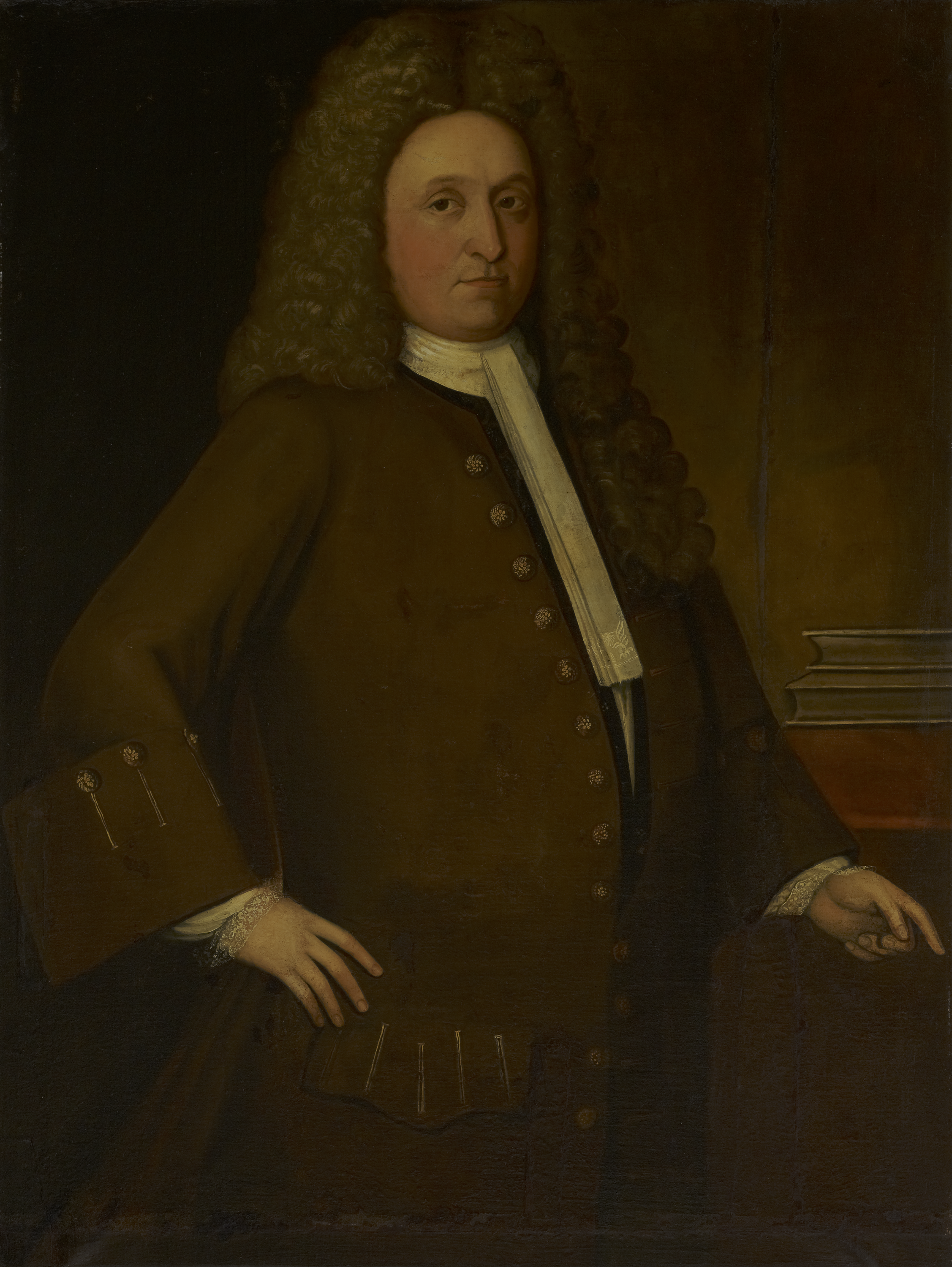
- c. 1720–1725 portrait

25th Governor of Connecticut Colony
- In office 1708–1724
- Preceded by: Fitz-John Winthrop
- Succeeded by: Joseph Talcott

Personal details
- Born: 27 March 1666 Haverhill, Massachusetts Bay Colony
- Died: 20 September 1724 (aged 58) New London, Colony of Connecticut
- Profession: Governor

Gurdon Saltonstall (27 March 1666 – 20 September 1724) was an American clergyman who served as the governor of Connecticut from 1708 to 1724. He was born into a distinguished family and became an eminent Connecticut pastor and a close associate of Governor Fitz-John Winthrop. Saltonstall was appointed the colony's governor after Winthrop's death in 1707, and then re-elected to the office annually until his own death.

== Early life and pastor ==
Saltonstall was the son of Nathaniel and Elizabeth (Ward) Saltonstall, a prominent north Massachusetts family active in Massachusetts politics since the 1630s. He received his bachelor's degree in 1684 from Harvard Divinity School, where he studied theology, and was awarded his master's degree in 1687. It was at this time that Saltonstall first preached at First Christ Church in New London where he impressed congregants enough to warrant his appointment as the town's sole pastor. Saltonstall soon grew close to Connecticut Governor Fitz-John Winthrop, and he became Winthrop's advisor in both spiritual and civil matters. Governor Winthrop's health failed him, and Saltonstall eventually began assuming executive responsibilities in the Governor's absence. He was married to Mary Whittinghame (d. 1730), a granddaughter of New York's Mayor John Lawrence (1618–1699).

== Political career ==
Coat of Arms of Gurdon Saltonstall

Upon Governor Winthrop's death in 1707, Saltonstall was appointed governor of the Colony of Connecticut by a special session of the legislature, a decision that sparked some outcry because of Saltonstall's status as clergy. Saltonstall himself was hesitant to leave his church and take on the position of governor, which prompted the state assembly to aid his First Church of Christ in finding a replacement pastor. His selection was approved by voters in May of that year, and Saltonstall continued to be re-elected annually until his death. Governor was just one of the influential positions held by Saltonstall, as he was appointed commander of the Connecticut militia and Chief Justice of its Superior Court.

Saltonstall believed strongly in the power of traditional authority, a trademark of his time as clergyman and governor. He was wholly intolerant of divergent Christian sects, and favored the enjoining of church and government into what he imagined would be a more effective system, an idea enumerated in the Saybrook Platform, a proposal mainly ascribed to him. The governor also found opposition to his government or dispute within it to be contemptible, and he frequently threatened to resign if such discord was not discontinued.

Saltonstall's support of established authority is also seen in his decision-making throughout Queen Anne's War, the second major intercolonial war over control of North America. The governor was a loyal supporter of the British cause, seeking to reduce colonial opposition to the war effort, and assisting it by increasing the recruitment and equipment of Connecticut militiamen sent to battle French forces. The Connecticut soldiers totaled 4,000 men, a sizable portion of the colony's 17,000 people. Because of the war's heavy costs, Connecticut's fiscal situation deteriorated, but Saltonstall's enthusiastic support for the Crown won the colony much improved relations with Great Britain.

The governor worked closely with Massachusetts Bay's Governor Joseph Dudley in peacefully resolving the problem of the "Equivalent Lands", just one of many border disputes demanding his attention.

In 1704, Saltonstall ruled against a mulatto slave seeking freedom: "According to the laws and constant practice of this Colony, and all other plantations (as well as the civil law) such persons as are born of negro bondwomen are themselves in like condition, that is born in servitude. Yet it saith expressly, that no man shall put away or make free his negro or mulatto slave, etc., which undeniably shows and declares an approbation of such servitude, and that mulattos may be held as slaves within this government."

== Personal life ==
His daughter, Katherine, married politician and soldier William Brattle, who was a classmate of Richard Saltonstall at Harvard University.

Political offices
Preceded by Fitz-John Winthrop	Governor of the Connecticut Colony; 1708–1724	Succeeded by Joseph Talcott
