= Endicott Peabody Saltonstall =

American attorney (1879–1922)

District Attorney of Middlesex County, Massachusetts
- In office October 6, 1921 – December 19, 1922
- Preceded by: Nathan A. Tufts
- Succeeded by: Arthur Kenneth Reading

Personal details
- Born: April 15, 1879 Newton, Massachusetts
- Died: December 19, 1922 (aged 43) Newton, Massachusetts
- Party: Republican
- Relations: John Clarke Lee (grandfather)
- Education: Harvard College; Harvard Law School
- Occupation: Lawyer

Endicott Peabody Saltonstall (April 15, 1879 – December 19, 1922) was an American attorney who served as District Attorney of Middlesex County, Massachusetts from 1921 to 1922.

== Early life ==
Saltonstall was born on December 25, 1872, to Leverett and Rose Smith (née Lee) Saltonstall (a daughter of John Clarke Lee). He graduated Harvard College in 1894 and Harvard Law School in 1897. He played a few games for the Harvard Crimson football after spending a year on the freshman squad. On November 2, 1898, he married Elizabeth Baldwin Dupee in Brookline, Massachusetts.

== Career ==
After law school, Saltonstall worked in the office of Nichols & Cobb in Boston. He then worked in the Boston Elevated Railway's legal department. From 1902 to 1905 he was affiliated with the firm of Richardson, Herrick & Neave. He then entered a partnership with Albert P. Carter and Robert G. Dodge. The partnership was dissolved in 1910. He later formed a partnership with Charles W. Blood.

=== Political career ===
From 1899 to 1904, Saltonstall was a member of the Newton, Massachusetts Board of Aldermen.

On October 5, 1921, Saltonstall was appointed District Attorney of Middlesex County by Governor Channing H. Cox. He succeeded Nathan A. Tufts, who had been removed from office for misconduct. He named his law partner Charles W. Blood as his first assistant and his nephew, Leverett Saltonstall, as second assistant. He was not a candidate in the 1922 election.

== Personal life ==
Saltonstall was married to Elizabeth Baldwin Dupee, a daughter of William Richardson Dupee and Jeannie Ursula Dupee. Together, they were the parents of:

- Endicott Peabody Saltonstall (1900–1943), who married Ellen Edwards.
- Elizabeth Saltonstall (1900–1990), an art teacher.
- Florence Saltonstall (1913–1990), who died unmarried.

Saltonstall died suddenly on December 19, 1922, at his home in Newton from an attack of phlebitis. His widow died in October 1951.
