= Stow Wengenroth =

American artist and lithographer

Stow Wengenroth (1906–1978) was an American artist and lithographer, born in 1906 in Brooklyn, New York. Wengenroth was once called "America's greatest living artist working in black and white" by the American realist painter Andrew Wyeth, and he is generally considered to be one of the finest American lithographers of the twentieth century. He studied at the Art Students League of New York under George Bridgman and John Fabian Carlson from 1923 to 1927, then at the Grand Central School of Art under Wayman Adams. Wengenroth was elected a member of the National Institute of Arts and Letters (renamed the American Academy of Arts and Letters) in 1942 and was also a member of the Connecticut Academy of Fine Arts and the Prairie Printmakers. He was elected an Associate of the prestigious National Academy of Design in 1938, and a full Academician in 1941. Wengenroth was also the author of several influential books on lithography.

Wengenroth's lithographs are found in most major American collections, including the Library of Congress, Whitney Museum of American Art, and Metropolitan Museum of Art. During his career, Wengenroth became well known for his detailed depictions of the seascapes and landscapes of New England and, in particular, Maine. As an artist, he eschewed colour in his lithographs but rather focused on shadow, light, and form to transmit detail and dimension. While his urban scenes of Manhattan and the New York City environs are especially coveted by the current market, Wengenroth was most adept at creating sincere yet vivid simulacra of the New England littoral and interior.

Lithographer and painter Elizabeth Saltonstall was one of his students.

== Selected exhibitions ==
- 1998: Mary Ryan Gallery, New York: Black & White: Four Decades of Prints, 1905-1947
- 1996: Kennedy Galleries, New York: American Master Prints

== Selected collections ==
- Library of Congress, Washington
- Smithsonian American Art Museum, Washington
- Whitney Museum of American Art, New York
- Metropolitan Museum of Art, New York
- Fogg Museum of Art, Cambridge
- Los Angeles County Museum of Art
- Pennsylvania Academy of Fine Arts
- Carnegie Institute, Pittsburgh
- Museum of Fine Arts, Boston
- Boston Public Library
- Art Complex Museum, Duxbury

== Personal life ==
Wengenroth's first wife was the author and doll maker Edith Flack Ackley.
