= John L. Saltonstall Jr. =

American politician (1916–2007)

John L. Saltonstall Jr. (1916 – April 25, 2007) was an American attorney and politician who served as a member of the Boston City Council from 1968 to 1972.

== Early life ==
Saltonstall was born Beverly, Massachusetts in 1916 to a family of prominent Massachusetts Republicans. He graduated from Harvard College in 1938 and Yale Law School in 1941. During World War II, he volunteered for military service three times, but was rejected each time for failing the physical exam. He instead served as a member of the National War Labor Board.

== Legal career ==
After the war, Saltonstall worked in New York City as an attorney for the American Civil Liberties Union. He later returned to Boston to work for the firm Hill and Barlow. From 1954 to 1956, he represented Harvard professor Leon Kamin, who was charged with contempt of Congress after he refused to identify fellow Communist party members during the Army–McCarthy hearings.

In 1964, he left his corporate practice for several weeks to represent several black civil rights workers who were being sued for libel in northern Mississippi. He later said: "I probably did work that was more intellectually challenging later on, but I probably never did any work that was more exciting."

In addition to his work with Hill and Barlow, Saltonstall also maintained a law office in Edgartown, Massachusetts. He also served as town counsel for Gay Head, Massachusetts.

Previously married and divorced, in 1976 he married Adriana Gianturco.

After retiring from Hill & Barlow, Saltonstall taught at the McGeorge School of Law.

== Politics ==
In 1958, Saltonstall was the Democratic Party candidate for United States Representative from Massachusetts's 10th congressional district. He lost to incumbent Laurence Curtis 52% to 48%.

In 1960, he was one of a group of former supporters of presidential candidate Adlai Stevenson who urged their "fellow liberals" to support John F. Kennedy for the Democratic Party's nomination, citing Kennedy's assurance of support for desegregation.

Saltonstall served on the Boston City Council from 1968 to 1972. In the 1971 election, he ran for Mayor of Boston. He finished in fifth place in the preliminary election with 4.86% of the vote.

He died in Fall River, Massachusetts, on April 25, 2007.
