= Paul R. Haley =

American politician

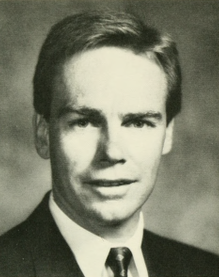

Member of the Massachusetts House of Representatives from the 4th Norfolk district
- In office 1990–2000

Personal details
- Party: Democratic
- Education: Harvard College (BA); Suffolk University Law School (JD)

Paul R. Haley is an American politician who was the member of the Massachusetts House of Representatives from the 4th Norfolk district from 1990 to 2000.
