= Leverett Saltonstall =

U.S. Senator and Governor of Massachusetts

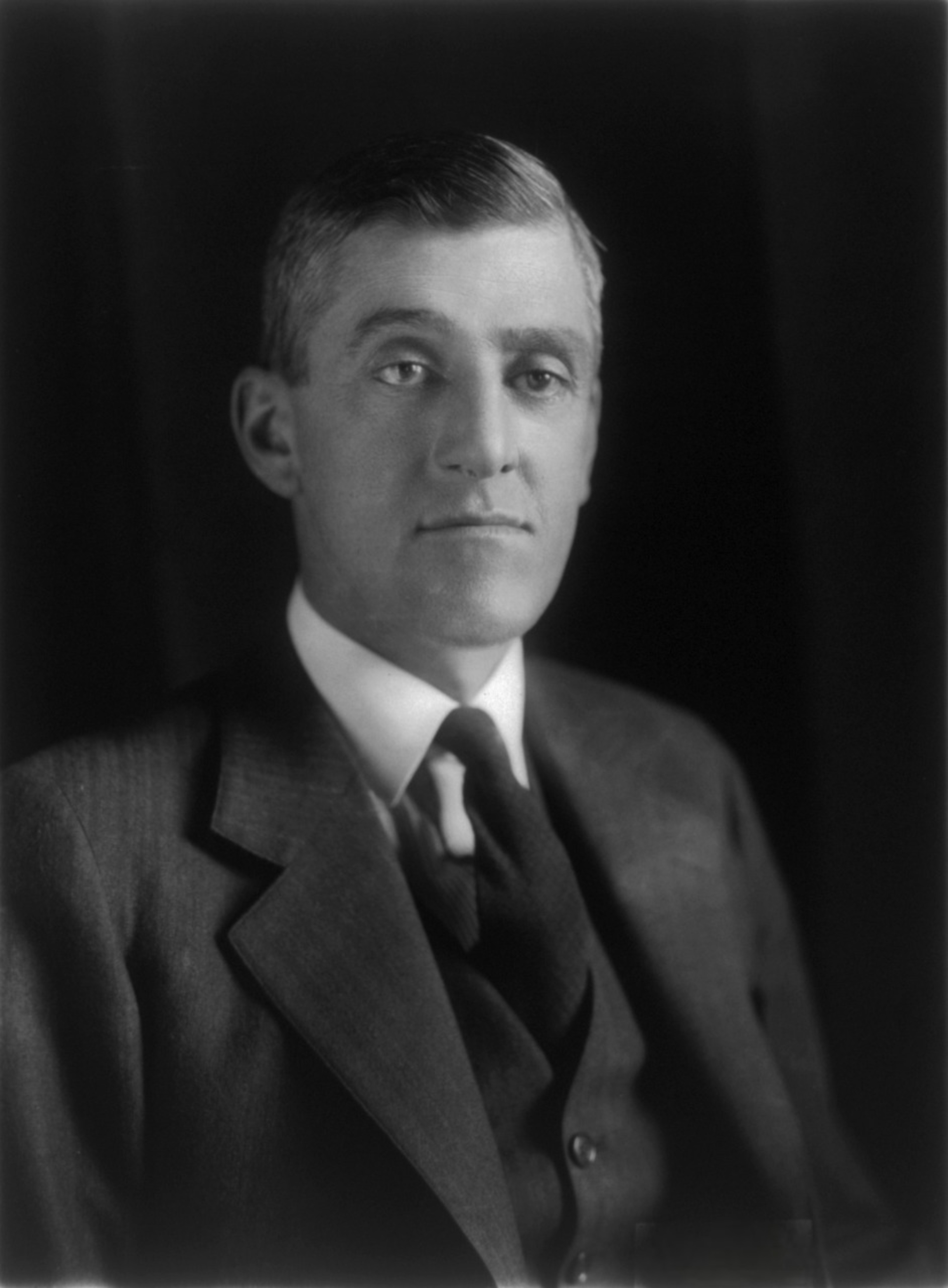
- Saltonstall in 1934

United States Senator from Massachusetts
- In office January 4, 1945 – January 3, 1967
- Preceded by: Sinclair Weeks
- Succeeded by: Edward Brooke
Senate positions
Chair of the Senate Republican Conference
In office January 3, 1957 – January 3, 1967
| Leader | Kenneth S. Wherry; Styles Bridges; Robert A. Taft; William F. Knowland |
| Deputy | Milton Young |
| Preceded by | Eugene Millikin |
| Succeeded by | Margaret Chase Smith |
Senate Minority Whip
In office January 3, 1955 – January 3, 1957
| Leader | William F. Knowland |
| Preceded by | Earle Clements |
| Succeeded by | Everett Dirksen |
In office January 3, 1949 – January 3, 1953
| Leader | Kenneth S. Wherry; Styles Bridges |
| Preceded by | Scott W. Lucas |
| Succeeded by | Earle C. Clements |
Senate Majority Whip
In office January 3, 1953 – January 3, 1955
| Leader | Robert A. Taft; William F. Knowland |
| Preceded by | Lyndon B. Johnson |
| Succeeded by | Earle C. Clements |
Chair of the Senate Armed Services Committee
In office January 3, 1953 – January 3, 1955
| Preceded by | Richard Russell Jr. |
| Succeeded by | Richard Russell Jr. |
Ranking Member of the Senate Armed Services Committee
In office January 3, 1963 – January 3, 1967
| Preceded by | Styles Bridges |
| Succeeded by | Margaret Chase Smith |

Chair of the National Governors Association
- In office June 20, 1943 – May 28, 1944
- Preceded by: Herbert O'Conor
- Succeeded by: Herbert B. Maw

55th Governor of Massachusetts
- In office January 5, 1939 – January 4, 1945
- Lieutenant: Horace T. Cahill
- Preceded by: Charles F. Hurley
- Succeeded by: Maurice J. Tobin

Speaker of the Massachusetts House of Representatives
- In office January 1929 – January 1937
- Preceded by: John Hull
- Succeeded by: Horace T. Cahill

Personal details
- Born: September 1, 1892 Chestnut Hill, Massachusetts, U.S.
- Died: June 17, 1979 (aged 86) Dover, Massachusetts, U.S.
- Party: Republican
- Spouse: Alice Wesselhoeft (m. 1916)
- Education: Harvard University (BA, LLB)
- Nickname: Salty

Military service
- Allegiance: United States
- Branch/service: United States Army
- Years of service: 1917–1919
- Rank: First Lieutenant
- Unit: 301st Field Artillery
- Battles/wars: World War I

Leverett Atholville Saltonstall (September 1, 1892 – June 17, 1979) was an American lawyer and politician from Massachusetts. He served three two-year terms as the 55th governor of Massachusetts, and for more than twenty years as a United States senator (1945–1967). Saltonstall was internationalist in foreign policy and moderate on domestic policy, serving as a well-liked mediating force in the Republican Party. He was the only member of the Republican Senate leadership to vote for the censure of Joseph McCarthy.

== Early years ==
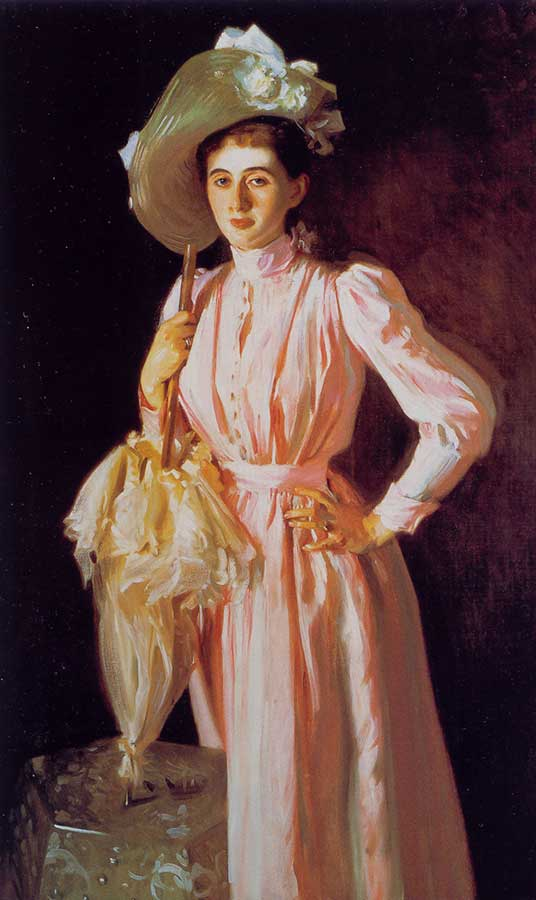
A portrait of Saltonstall's mother Eleanor c. 1890 by John Singer Sargent, titled Miss Eleanor Brooks (Mrs. Richard Middlecott Saltonstall).

Leverett Saltonstall was born on September 1, 1892 in Chestnut Hill, Massachusetts to Richard Middlecott Saltonstall, an attorney, and Eleanor Brooks Saltonstall, an heiress to the Peter Chardon Brooks fortune. Saltenstall's parents had a circle of friends which included future President Theodore Roosevelt.

The Saltonstall family had deep colonial roots, as did the Brooks family of his mother. Saltonstall was able to trace his ancestral roots to the Mayflower; his grandfather and great-grandfather were both also named Leverett Saltonstall.

Saltonstall was educated at the private Noble and Greenough School in Dedham and the Evans School for Boys in Mesa, Arizona, an upper-crust ranch school where his classmates included Nicholas Roosevelt.

He attended Harvard College, graduating in 1914. He was active in varsity sports at Harvard, notably captaining the first American crew to win the Grand Challenge Cup at the Henley Royal Regatta in 1914. He also played football and hockey, scoring a dramatic overtime goal in a 1914 win over Hobey Baker's Princeton team. He coached Harvard's freshman football team in 1915.

He graduated from Harvard Law School in 1917. While at Harvard Law, he married Alice Wesselhoeft of Jaffrey, New Hampshire. They had six children.

== Military service and early political career ==
After graduation, Saltonstall entered the United States Army. He served as a first lieutenant in the 301st Field Artillery Regiment in the 76th Division in World War I, spending six months in France. He was discharged in 1919, and then entered the law firm of his uncle.

Saltonstall, a socially progressive Republican, entered politics as an alderman in Newton, Massachusetts, serving from 1920 to 1922, while simultaneously serving as second assistant district attorney of Middlesex County under his uncle, Endicott Peabody Saltonstall, from 1921 to 1922. He was elected to the Massachusetts House of Representatives that same year; there he rose to the position of Speaker of the House, which he held from 1929 to 1937.

In 1930 Saltonstall became a compatriot of the Massachusetts Society of the Sons of the American Revolution.

== Governor of Massachusetts ==
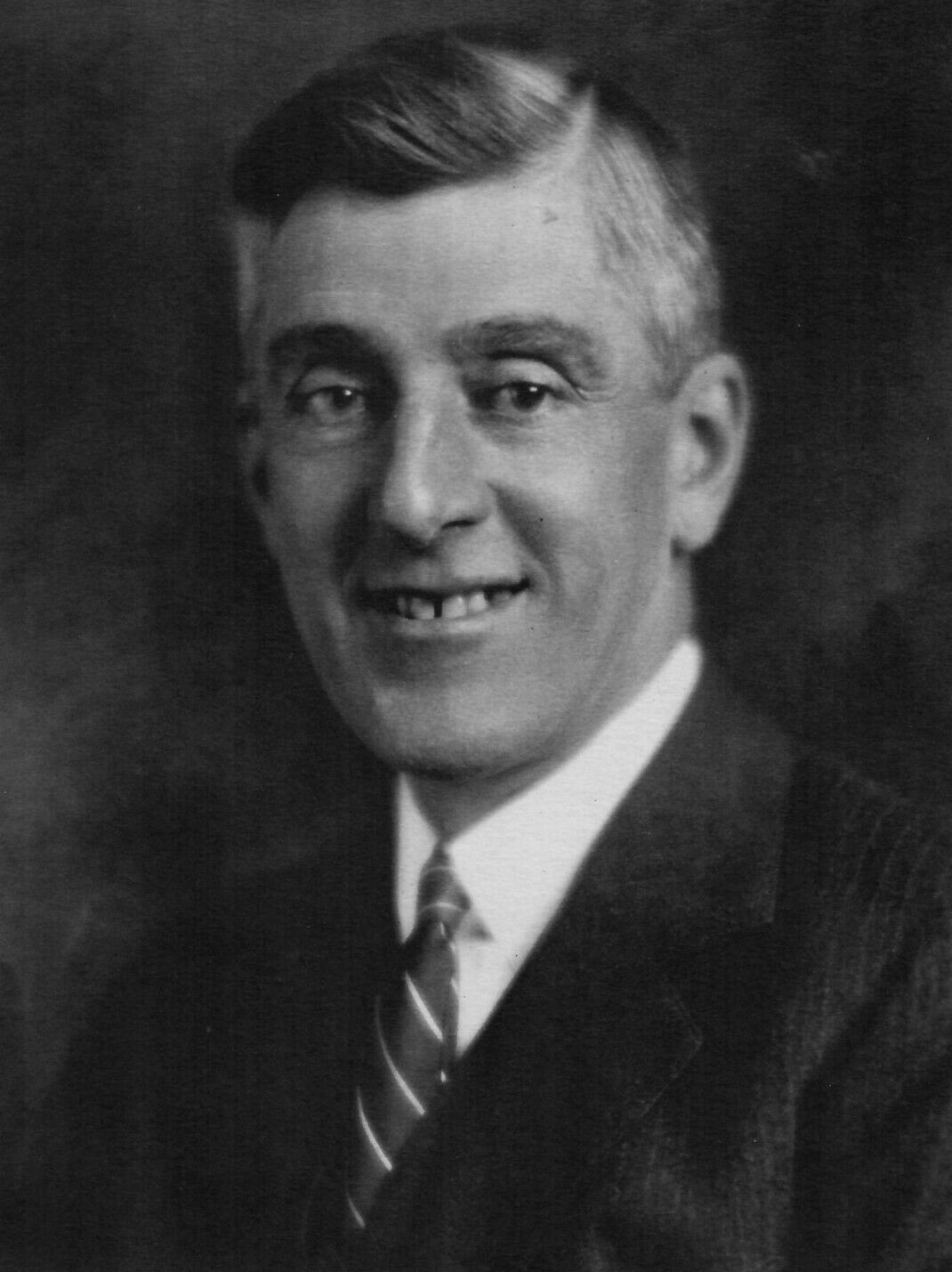
Saltonstall as governor.

In 1936, Saltonstall decided to seek the Republican nomination for Governor of Massachusetts. In the party convention, conservative forces prevailed in securing the nomination for John W. Haigis. Saltonstall's friends were able to engineer his nomination for lieutenant governor. Both Haigis and Saltonstall were defeated by their Democratic rivals, although Saltonstall's margin of defeat, just over 7,000 votes, was small enough to merit a recount; he demurred. He ran again for governor two years later, and won a decisive victory over former Boston Mayor James Michael Curley, who had been involved in a bruising Democratic primary fight against the incumbent Charles F. Hurley.

He was reelected in 1940 and 1942; the 1940 election win was by an extremely narrow margin. During his tenure, Saltonstall mediated a Teamsters strike, reduced taxes, and retired 90 percent of the state's debt. He served as president of the National Governors Association from 1943 to 1944. In 1944, he also served as the fifth president of the Council of State Governments.

== U.S. Senator ==
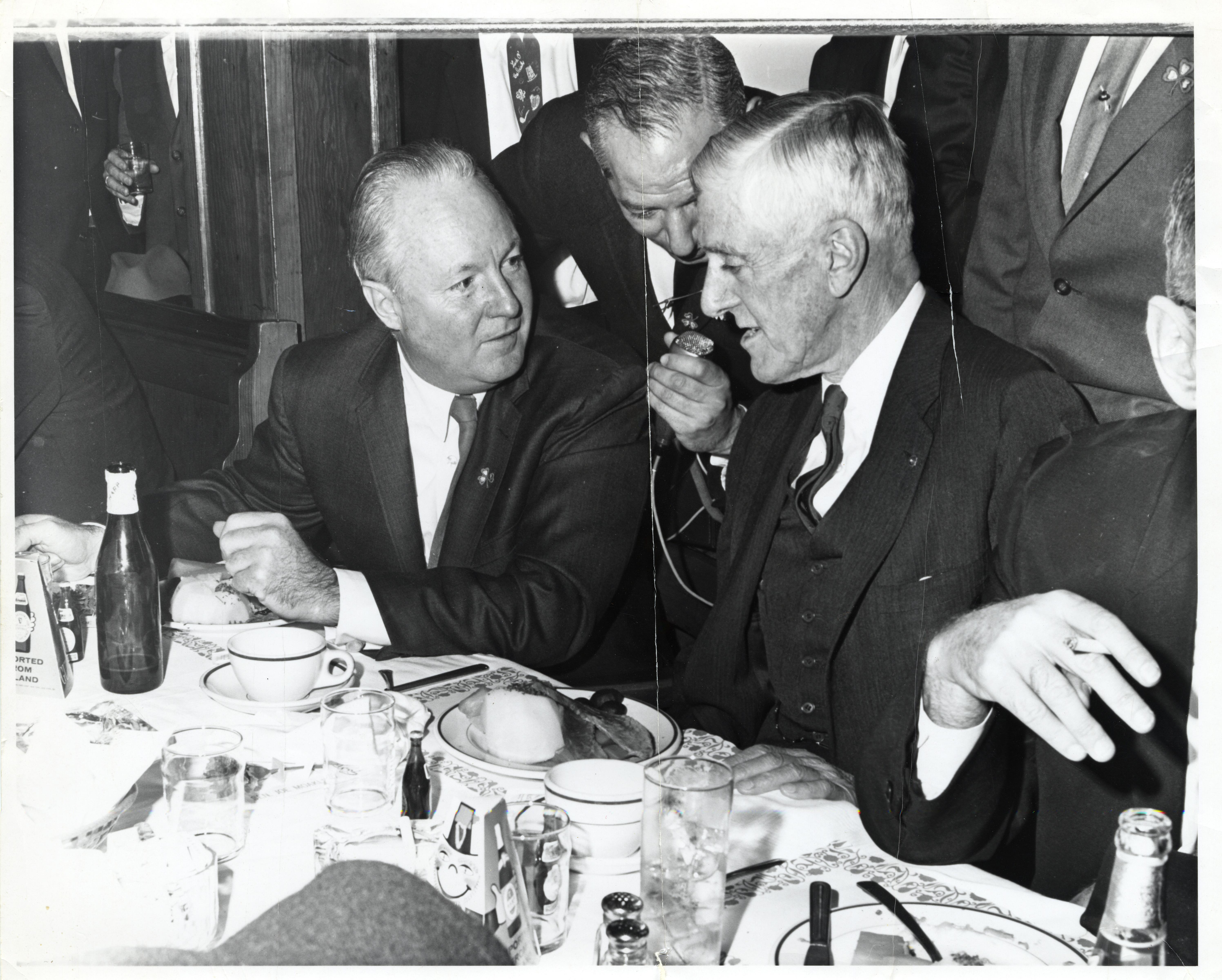
Saltonstall with Boston Mayor John F. Collins (1960–1968). In 1966, Collins ran to succeed Saltonstall when he retired but lost in the Democratic primary to former Massachusetts Governor Endicott Peabody (who in turn lost to Massachusetts Attorney General Edward Brooke).

In 1944, Saltonstall was elected to the United States Senate in a special election to fill the unexpired term created by the resignation of U.S. Senator Henry Cabot Lodge Jr. He was re-elected three times, serving from 1945 to 1967. Early in his first term, in April 1945 he was one of a dozen Senators and Congressmen who toured the Buchenwald Concentration Camp at the invitation of Gen. Dwight Eisenhower to attest to the reality of Nazi atrocities. Those he defeated included John H. Corcoran in 1944, John I. Fitzgerald in 1948, Foster Furcolo in 1954, and Thomas J. O'Connor in 1960.

During his tenure in the Senate, he served as the Senate Republican Whip and on five influential Senate committees, including the Senate Armed Services Committee (where he was also a longtime member of the CIA subcommittee). Regarding the CIA, he famously remarked that "there are things that my government does that I would rather not know about." He also served as the chair of the Senate Republican Conference, 1957–1967. He was viewed as a political moderate, and served as a mediating force between the party's conservative and progressive wings. He was an unspectacular but effective legislator, good at drafting legislation and finding compromise language. When he left office, after more than thirty years in politics, he had few political enemies.

Saltonstall voted in favor of the Civil Rights Acts of 1957, 1960, and 1964, as well as the 24th Amendment to the U.S. Constitution and the Voting Rights Act of 1965. Saltonstall was one of thirteen Republican senators to vote in favor of the creation of Medicare. As a senator, Saltonstall was described by The Washington Post as neither liberal or conservative, but as being on the side of common sense.

== Personal life ==
In 1916, Saltonstall married Alice Wesselhoeft (1893–1981) of Jaffrey, New Hampshire. Together they had six children, including:

- Emily (1920–2006), at one time the daughter-in-law of Richard Byrd and a former WAVE;
- Peter Brooks Saltonstall (1921–1944), killed in action at the Battle of Guam in 1944;
- William L. Saltonstall (1927–2009), a member of the Massachusetts Senate; and
- Susan (1930–1994), a horse breeder.

== Death and legacy ==
Saltonstall opted not to run for reelection in 1966, in part to provide an opportunity for his seat to Edward Brooke, a rising star in Massachusetts Republican circles. He retired to his farm in Dover, where he spent his remaining years as a gentleman farmer.

Leverett Saltonstall died of congestive heart failure in 1979 aged 86, and is buried in Harmony Grove Cemetery in Salem, Massachusetts. The Saltonstall Building in downtown Boston is named for him.

== See also ==
- Massachusetts legislature: 1923–1924, 1925–1926, 1927–1928, 1929-1930, 1931–1932, 1933–1934, 1935–1936
- Massachusetts House of Representatives' 5th Middlesex district
- List of members of the American Legion

== Sources ==
- Bingmann, Melissa (2015). Prep School Cowboys: Ranch Schools in the American West. Albuquerque, NM: University of New Mexico Press. ISBN 9780826355447. OCLC 897467026.
- Falla, Jack (2010). Open Ice: Reflections and Confessions of a Hockey Lifer. Mississauga, Ontario: John Wiley. ISBN 9780470738719. OCLC 373450213.
- Mead, Mead, ed. (1921). Harvard's Military Record in the World War. Harvard University Press. p. 836. OCLC 1191594.
- Reichard, Gary (1999). "Saltonstall, Leverett". Dictionary of American National Biography. Vol. 19. New York: Oxford University Press. pp. 223–224. ISBN 9780195206357. OCLC 39182280.
- Rosenberg, Chaim (2015). Yankee Colonies across America: Cities upon the Hills. Lanham, MD: Lexington Books. ISBN 9781498519847. OCLC 934035950.
- Saltonstall, Leverett; Weeks, Edward (1976). Salty: Recollections of a Yankee in Politics. Boston, Mass.: The Boston Globe.
- Saltonstall, Nora (2004). "Out Here at the Front": The World War I Letters of Nora Saltonstall. Boston: University Press of New England. ISBN 9781555535988. OCLC 249962709.

Political offices
| Preceded by John Hull | Speaker of the Massachusetts House of Representatives; 1929–1937 | Succeeded by Horace T. Cahill |
| Preceded by Charles F. Hurley | Governor of Massachusetts; 1939–1945 | Succeeded by Maurice J. Tobin |
| Preceded by Herbert O'Conor | Chair of the National Governors Association; 1943–1944 | Succeeded by Herbert B. Maw |
Party political offices
| Preceded by John W. Haigis | Republican nominee for Lieutenant Governor of Massachusetts; 1936 | Succeeded by Horace T. Cahill |
| Preceded by John W. Haigis | Republican nominee for Governor of Massachusetts; 1938, 1940, 1942 | Succeeded by Horace T. Cahill |
| Preceded by Henry Cabot Lodge Jr. | Republican nominee for U.S. Senator from Massachusetts (Class 2); 1944, 1948, 1954, 1960 | Succeeded by Edward Brooke |
| Preceded by Kenneth S. Wherry | Senate Republican Whip; 1949–1957 | Succeeded by Everett Dirksen |
| Preceded by Eugene Millikin | Chair of the Senate Republican Conference; 1957–1967 | Succeeded by Margaret Chase Smith |
U.S. Senate
| Preceded by Sinclair Weeks | United States Senator (Class 2) from Massachusetts; 1945–1967; Served alongside: David I. Walsh, Henry Cabot Lodge Jr., John F. Kennedy, Benjamin A. Smith II, Ted Kennedy | Succeeded by Edward Brooke |
| Preceded by Scott W. Lucas | Senate Minority Whip; 1949–1953 | Succeeded by Earle Clements |
| Preceded by Lyndon B. Johnson | Senate Majority Whip; 1953–1955 | Succeeded by Earle Clements |
| Preceded by Earle Clements | Senate Minority Whip; 1955–1957 | Succeeded by Everett Dirksen |
| Preceded by Richard Russell Jr. | Chair of the Senate Armed Services Committee; 1953–1955 | Succeeded by Richard Russell Jr. |
| Preceded by Richard Russell Jr. | Ranking Member of the Senate Armed Services Committee; 1955–1967 | Succeeded by Margaret Chase Smith |
| Preceded by Edward J. Thye | Ranking Member of the Senate Small Business Committee; 1959–1967 | Succeeded by Jacob Javits |
| Preceded by Styles Bridges | Ranking Member of the Senate Appropriations Committee; 1961–1967 | Succeeded by Milton Young |
