= Leverett Saltonstall I =

American politician

Leverett Saltonstall
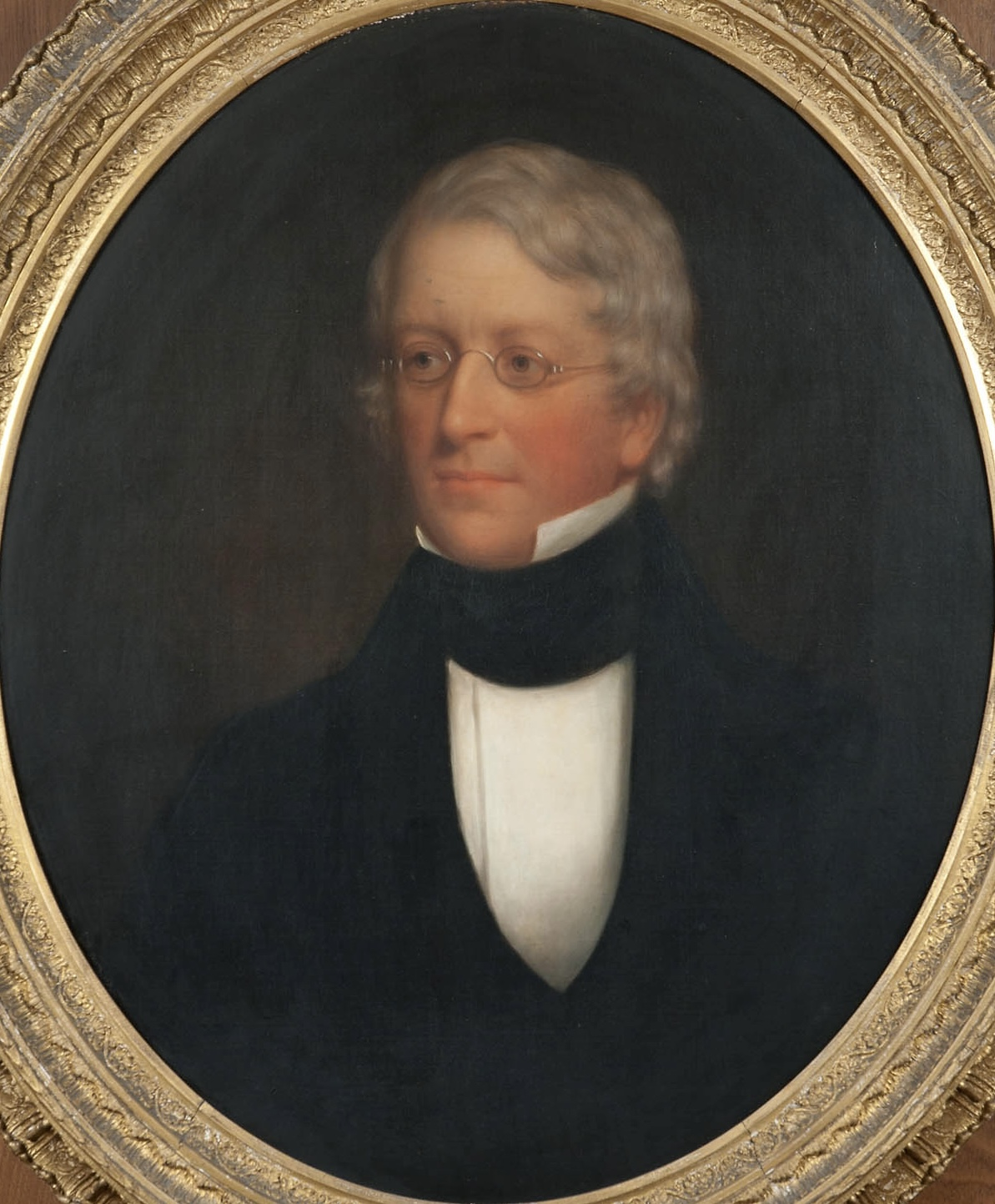
- Portrait by Chester Harding, c. 1836

Member of the U.S. House of Representatives from Massachusetts's 2nd district
- In office December 5, 1838 – March 3, 1843
- Preceded by: Stephen C. Phillips
- Succeeded by: Daniel P. King

1st Mayor of Salem, Massachusetts
- In office April 1836 – December 1838
- Preceded by: Board of Selectmen
- Succeeded by: Stephen C. Phillips

President of the Massachusetts Senate
- In office 1831–1832
- Preceded by: James Fowler
- Succeeded by: William Thorndike

Member of the Massachusetts Senate
- In office 1817–1819
- In office 1831–1832

Member of the Massachusetts House of Representatives
- In office 1813–1814
- In office 1816
- In office 1822
- In office 1829
- In office 1834
- In office 1844

Personal details
- Born: June 13, 1783 Haverhill, Massachusetts
- Died: May 8, 1845 (aged 61) Salem, Massachusetts
- Resting place: Harmony Grove Cemetery
- Party: Whig
- Spouse: Mary Elizabeth Sanders
- Children: Leverett Saltonstall II
- Profession: Attorney

Leverett Saltonstall (June 13, 1783 – May 8, 1845), was a member of the United States House of Representatives from Massachusetts who also served as Speaker of the Massachusetts House of Representatives, President of the Massachusetts Senate, the first Mayor of Salem, Massachusetts and a Member of the Board of Overseers of Harvard College.

Saltonstall was a great-grandfather of Massachusetts Governor and U.S. Senator Leverett Saltonstall (1892–1979).

== Early life and education ==
Saltonstall was born in Haverhill, Massachusetts, June 13, 1783 as a member of the Saltonstall family. He pursued classical studies, attending Phillips Exeter Academy, Exeter, New Hampshire, and was graduated from Harvard University in 1802. He studied law, and was admitted to the bar association and commenced practice in Salem, Massachusetts, in 1805.

== Salem City Hall ==
Salem City Hall was built in 1837–1838 under the supervision of Mayor Leverett Saltonstall and a committee appointed for that purpose. The cornerstone was laid on September 6, 1837. Artifacts buried beneath the cornerstone included copies of local newspapers, the Mayor's speech for the organization of City Government (May 9, 1836), and the new City Charter.

== Estate of Simon Forrester ==
Saltonstall, his brother-in-law Dudley Leavitt Pickman and Nathaniel Bowditch all acted as trustees of the estate of Simon Forrester, a ship captain born in Ireland who became one of pioneers of Salem merchant shipping and one of Salem's leading merchants and philanthropists.

== Positions and offices ==
- A delegate to the Massachusetts Constitutional Convention in 1820.
- An unsuccessful candidate for election to the 17th United States Congress in 1820.
- A member of the Massachusetts House of Representatives in 1813, 1814, 1816, 1822, 1829, 1834, and 1844.
- Served in the Massachusetts Senate, 1817–1819, 1831, and 1832, and was President of the Massachusetts Senate in 1831 and 1832.
- Elected a Fellow of the American Academy of Arts and Sciences in 1824.
- The first mayor of Salem, serving 1836–1837.
- Elected as a Whig to the 25th United States Congress to fill the vacancy caused by the resignation of Stephen C. Phillips, and then reelected to the Twenty-sixth and Twenty-seventh Congresses, serving from December 5, 1838, to March 3, 1843.
- Chairman for the Committee on Expenditures in the Department of the Navy (Twenty-sixth Congress).
- Committee on Manufactures (Twenty-seventh Congress).
- Unsuccessful candidate for reelection to the Twenty-eighth Congress.
- Overseer of Harvard University, 1835–1845.

== Death and burial ==
Leverett Saltonstall died in Salem, Essex County, Massachusetts, May 8, 1845, and rests in Harmony Grove Cemetery.

Political offices
Preceded by James Fowler	President of the Massachusetts Senate; 1831 - 1832	Succeeded by William Thorndike
Preceded by Board of Selectmen	First Mayor of Salem, Massachusetts; 1836 - 1838	Succeeded by Stephen C. Phillips
U.S. House of Representatives
Preceded by Stephen C. Phillips	Member of the U.S. House of Representatives from Massachusetts's 2nd congressional district December 5, 1838 – March 3, 1843	Succeeded by Daniel P. King
