= Port of Boston =

Seaport district in Boston, Massachusetts

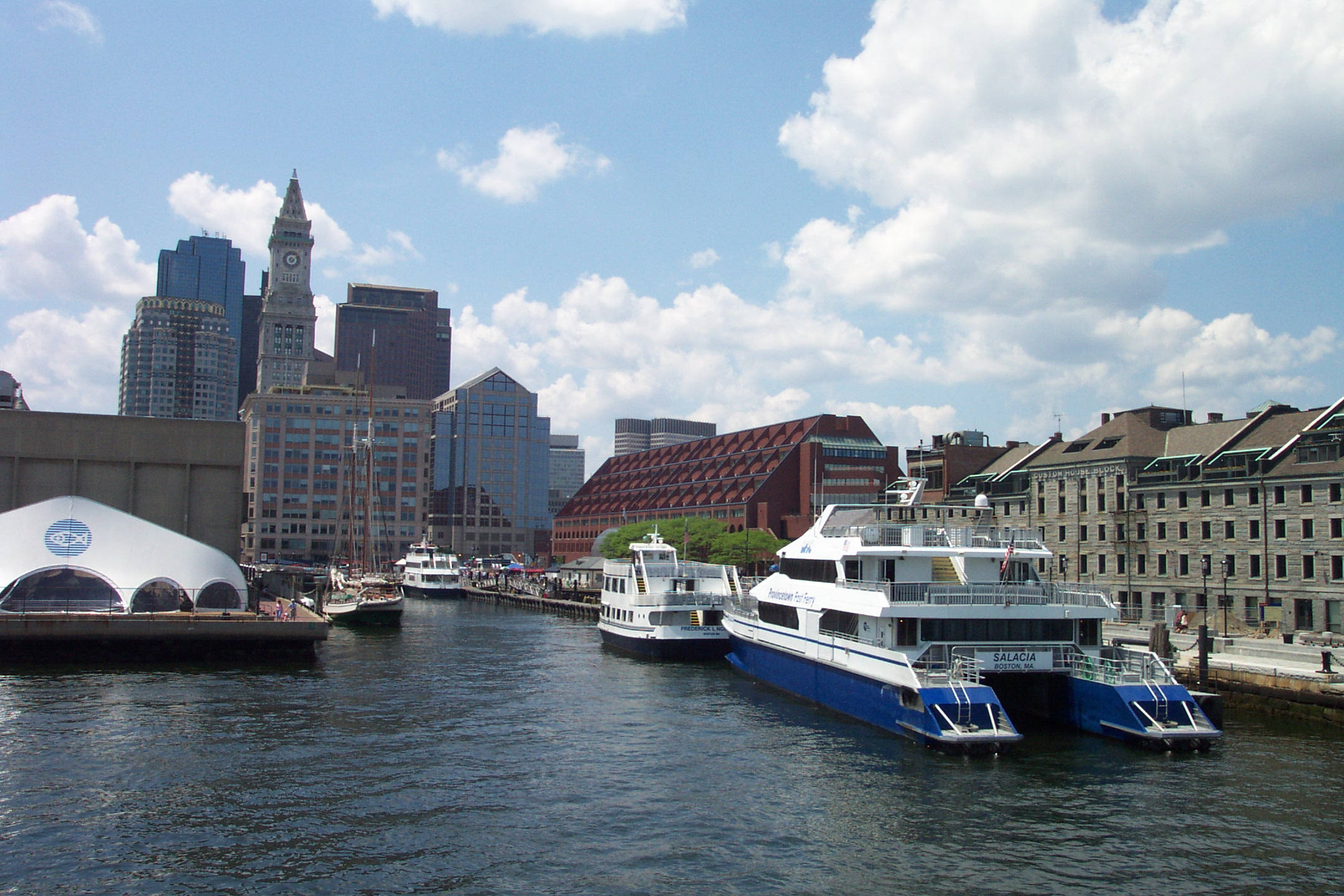
- Long Wharf in downtown Boston, once the main commercial wharf within the port, but now used by ferries and cruise boats.
- Interactive map of Port of Boston

Location
- Country: United States
- Location: Boston, Suffolk County, MA
- Coordinates: 42°21′48.96″N 71°2′11.77″W

Details
- Operated by: Massachusetts Port Authority (Massport)
- Owned by: Government of Massachusetts
- Type of Harbor: Natural/artificial
- Size of harbour: 500 acres (200 ha)
- No. of berths
- No. of wharfs
- No. of piers
- Employees
- Port Director: Lauren Gleason
- Draft depth: 40 feet
- Air draft: Unrestricted

Statistics
- Website www.massport.com

The Port of Boston (AMS Seaport Code: 0401, UN/LOCODE: US BOS) is a major seaport located in Boston Harbor and adjacent to the City of Boston. It is the largest port in Massachusetts and one of the principal ports on the East Coast of the United States.

The Port of Boston was historically important for the growth of the City of Boston, and was originally located in what is now the downtown area of the city, called Long Wharf. Land reclamation and conversion to other uses means that the downtown area no longer handles commercial traffic, although there is still considerable ferry and leisure usage at Long Wharf. Today the principal cargo handling facilities are located in the Boston neighborhoods of Charlestown, East Boston, and South Boston, and in the neighboring city of Everett. The Port of Boston has also been an entry point for many immigrants.

== Administration ==
The Massachusetts Port Authority (Massport) was created in 1956 by a special act of the Massachusetts General Court; however, the Authority was not enabled until 1959, due to delay in bond funding. The Authority is an independent public authority under state law, not a state agency within the cabinet. The Massachusetts Secretary of Transportation and Public Works serves as an ex-officio member of the board and the remaining six members are appointed by the governor to staggered seven year terms. Its Board members must be residents of Massachusetts. The Department of Homeland Security also has a presence with United States Customs and Border Protection officers. The port has three areas of activity: cargo, cruises and ferry service.

== History ==
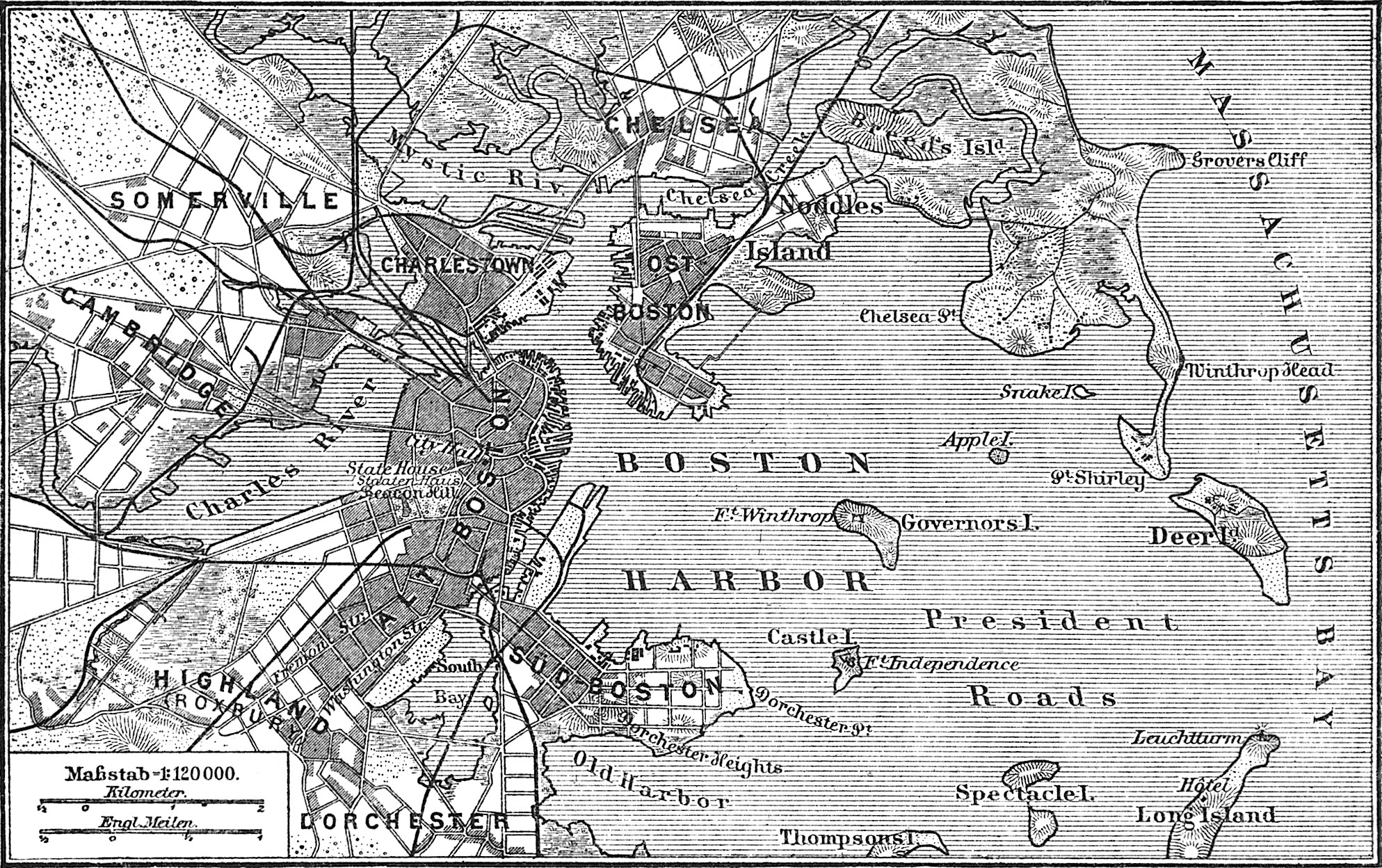
A map of Boston Harbor from 1890

Before the colonization of the Americas, the area served as a trading post for Native Americans in the region. After the establishment of the Boston settlement by John Winthrop in 1630 and the creation of a local shipbuilding industry, the port served the rapidly expanding American colonies. During that time, trade involved finished goods from England in exchange for lumber, fully constructed vessels, rum, and salted fish.

With the rapid growth of the Mid-Atlantic colonies in the 1750s, the ports of New York and Philadelphia, Pennsylvania began to surpass Boston for inter-colony trade. In response, Bostonian merchants established trade with foreign nations besides Great Britain. This trade led to a huge increase in wealth amongst local Bay State merchants. However, the British government's imposition of regulations restricting trade to Great Britain, combined with newly enacted taxes on the colonists, caused Bostonian merchants to join the more radical elements in American society. After the Boston Tea Party, the British Parliament passed the Boston Port Act which shut down the port until the East India Company was compensated for the damaged tea. These actions led to the American Revolutionary War.

Though economically devastated by the Revolutionary War, the Port of Boston was again prospering with trade with various foreign ports such as Shanghai. The port's fortunes were further augmented with a navy base at Charlestown. By the mid-19th century, the shipbuilding industry reached its peak as displayed by the clipper ships developed by Donald McKay. The port also saw many land reclamation projects and the construction of new piers.

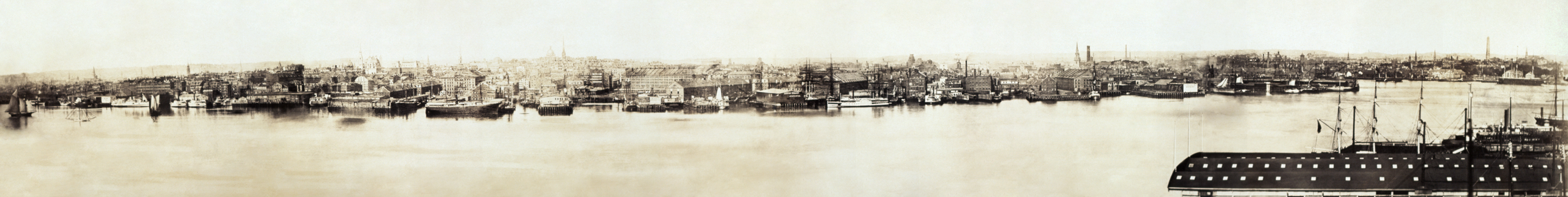
The port of Boston, 1876.

With the start of the Industrial Revolution in the United States, activity in the port turned towards trade between the states. Starting in the mid-19th century, the Port of Boston was eclipsed yet again by other eastern seaboard ports such the Port of New York City as local merchant companies were bought out by New York businessmen. In 1956, control of the port was handed to the Massachusetts Port Authority (Massport), which began the process of modernizing the port. During the 1980s and 1990s, a project dedicated to the cleanup of Boston Harbor was overseen by the Massachusetts Water Resource Authority (MWRA).

In 1966, Sea-Land introduced containerized shipping and later established one of the first container ports on Castle Island, where Conley Terminal now stands. To meet the growing demand for container shipping, Massport constructed a common-use container port on what is now Moran Terminal. However, the port faced a setback with the closure of the Charlestown Navy Yard in 1974.

In the mid-1990s, the port went through another round of modernization. Container shipping operations were consolidated at Conley Terminal while Moran Terminal was dedicated to automobile shipping. A project of dredging the harbor commenced in 1997. Through the Central Artery/Tunnel Project (Big Dig), ground access to the South Boston facilities were improved with the extension of I-90 and the construction of the Ted Williams Tunnel linking South Boston with East Boston and Logan International Airport. The port has also seen a burgeoning cruise industry as well as expanding commercial and residential developments on the Boston waterfront.

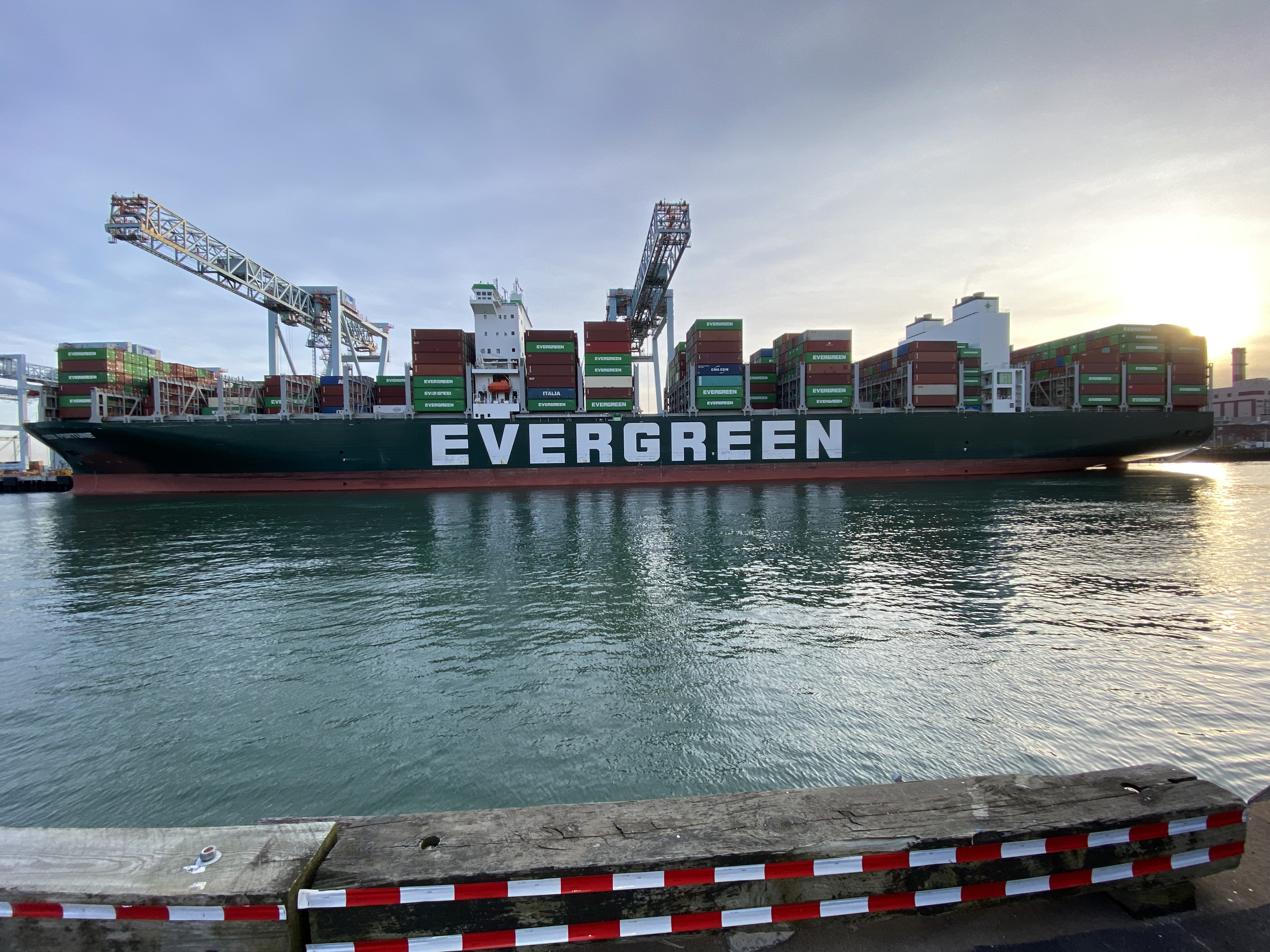
12,000-TEU-class container ship Ever Fortune in Boston Harbor, January 2022

With the completed Panama Canal expansion project allowing larger ships starting in 2016, the United States Army Corps of Engineers is dredging harbor access routes starting in 2017, deepening them from 40 to 47 to 51 feet. This will allow visits by container ships carrying up to 12,000 TEUs, up from 7000 TEUs, and reduce the amount of freight which is expected to be shipped to the Port of New York and New Jersey and trucked to Massachusetts. The project is estimated to cost $310 million and is paid for by the federal Water Resources Reform and Development Act (about two-thirds), Massport, and an additional allocation from the Commonwealth of Massachusetts. New container cranes to support larger ships were installed in 2021. The first 12,000-TEU-class containership. Ever Fortune, arrived at Conley on January 16, 2022.

=== List of collectors ===
- Benjamin Lincoln (1789–1809)
- Henry Dearborn (March 1809–January 27, 1812)
- Henry A. S. Dearborn (1813–1829)
- David Henshaw (1829–1837)
- George Bancroft (1837–1841)
- Levi Lincoln Jr. (1841–September 1843)
- Robert Rantoul Jr. (1843–1844)
- Lemuel Williams Jr. (1844–1845)
- Marcus Morton (1845–1849)
- Philip Greely Jr. (1849–1853)
- Charles H. Peaslee (1853–1857)
- Arthur W. Austin (1857–1860)
- James Scollay Whitney (1860–1861)
- John Z. Goodrich (1861–1865)
- Hannibal Hamlin (1865–1866)
- Darius N. Couch (1866–1867)
- Thomas Russell (1867–1874)
- William A. Simmons (1874–1878)
- Alanson W. Beard (1878–1882)
- Roland Worthington (May 15, 1882–1885)
- Leverett Saltonstall II (1885–1889)
- Alanson W. Beard (1889–1893)
- Winslow Warren (1894–1898)
- George H. Lyman (1898–1909)
- Edwin Upton Curtis (1909–1913)
- Edmund Billings (1913–1921)
- Willfred W. Lufkin (July 1, 1921–1933)
- Joseph A. Maynard (1933–1938)
- Joseph McGrath (1938–April 25, 1943)
- William H. Burke Jr. (December 17, 1944–1952)
- Carroll Meins (1953–September 14, 1953)
- Maynard Hutchinson (April 30, 1954–1961)
- Peter W. Princi (September 13, 1961–1962)
- John M. Lynch (1962–1966)

== Port facilities ==
=== Ground transportation ===
The Port of Boston has access to I-90, I-93, I-95, and U.S. 1, including a truck-only haul road. Track 61 runs through the port, but as of 2019 is being used by the MBTA as a test track. There is public transit access via the MBTA Silver line SL2 route.

=== Massport facilities ===
Port of Boston terminal locations
1 Flynn Cruiseport Boston
2 Conley Terminal
3 Boston Autoport
4 Boston Fish Pier

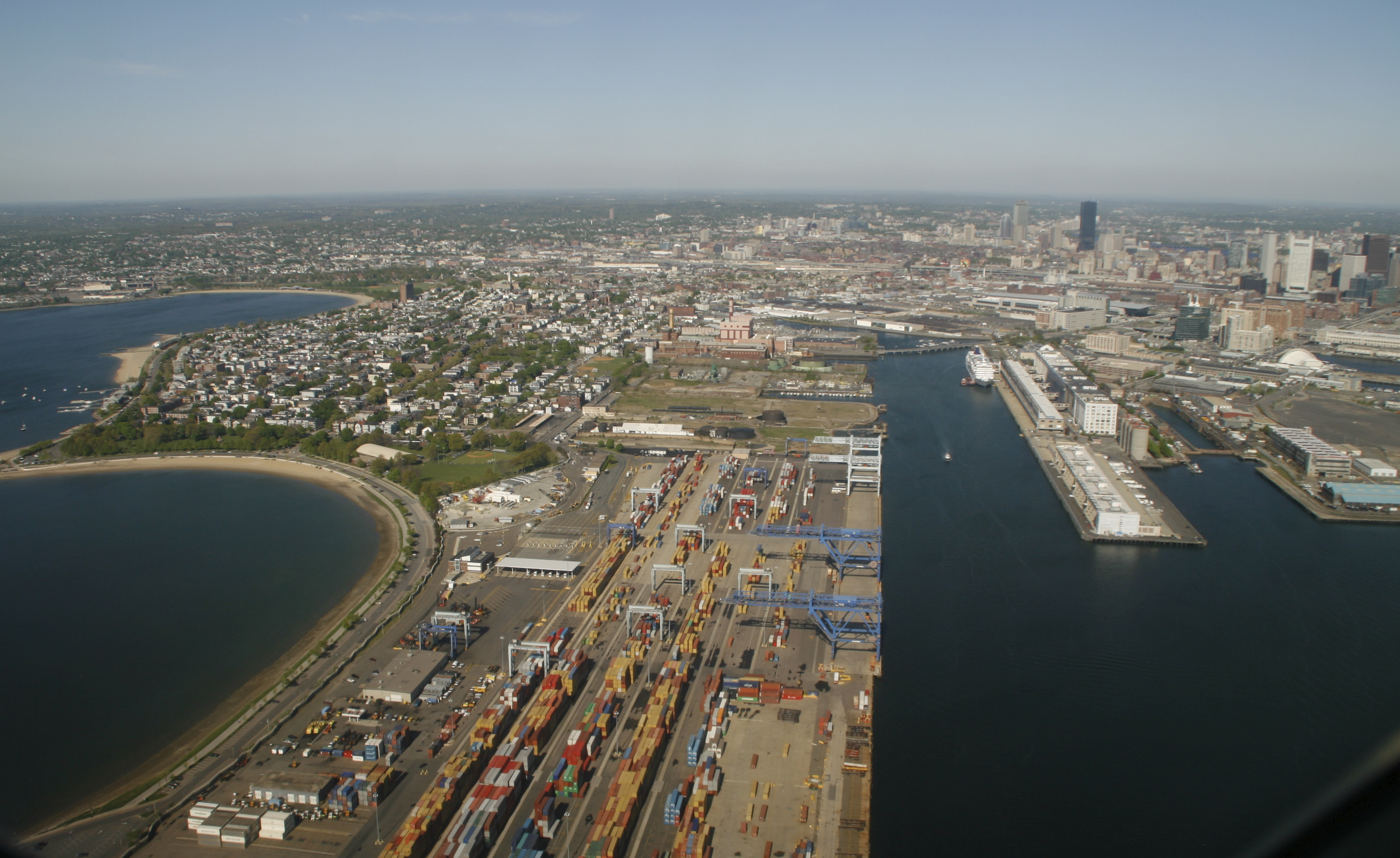
Aerial view of part of Boston Harbor. From left to right Pleasure Bay, Conley Container Terminal, Reserved Channel, Black Falcon Cruise Terminal and Dry Dock number 3.

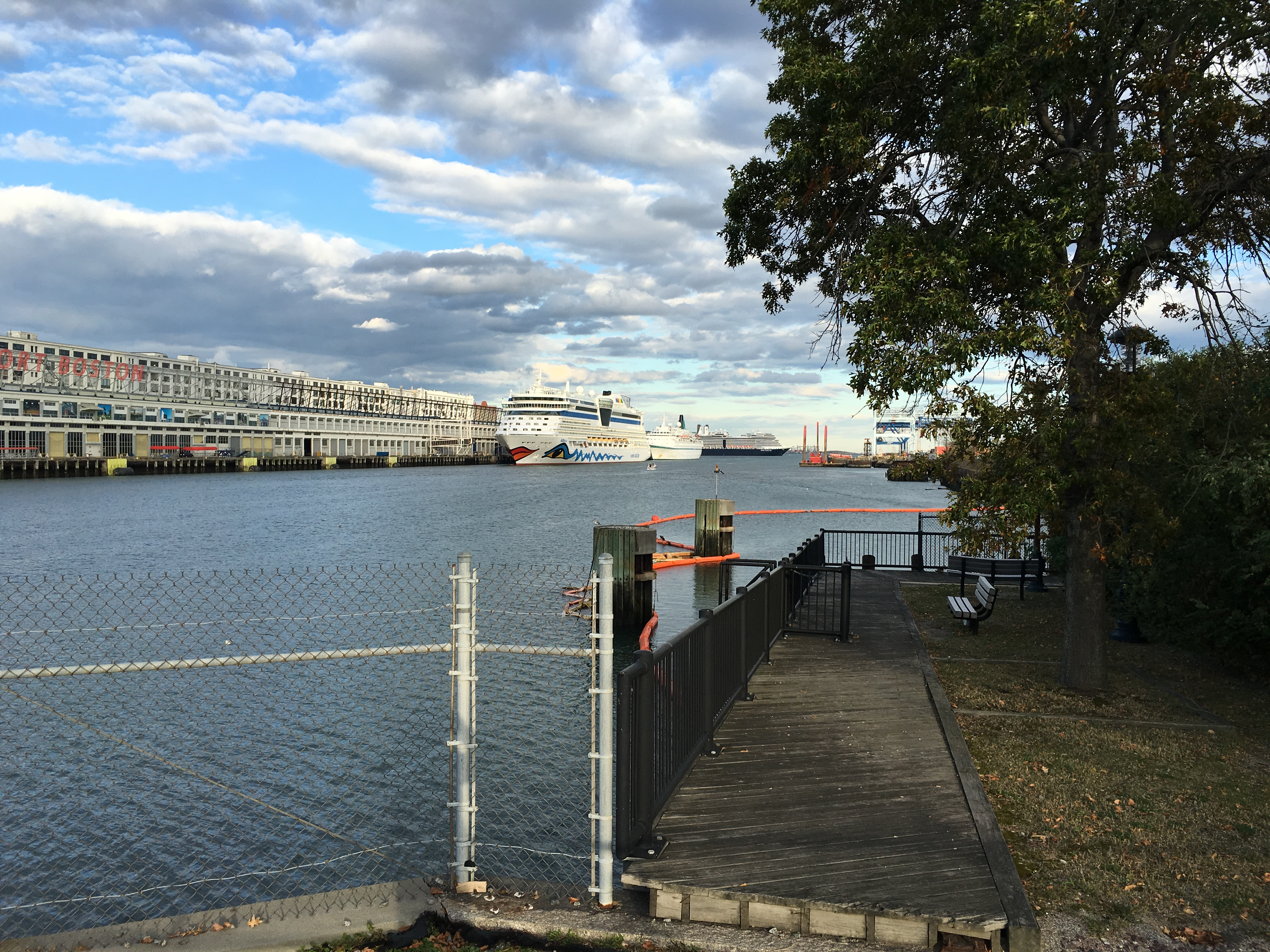
Black Falcon Cruise Terminal

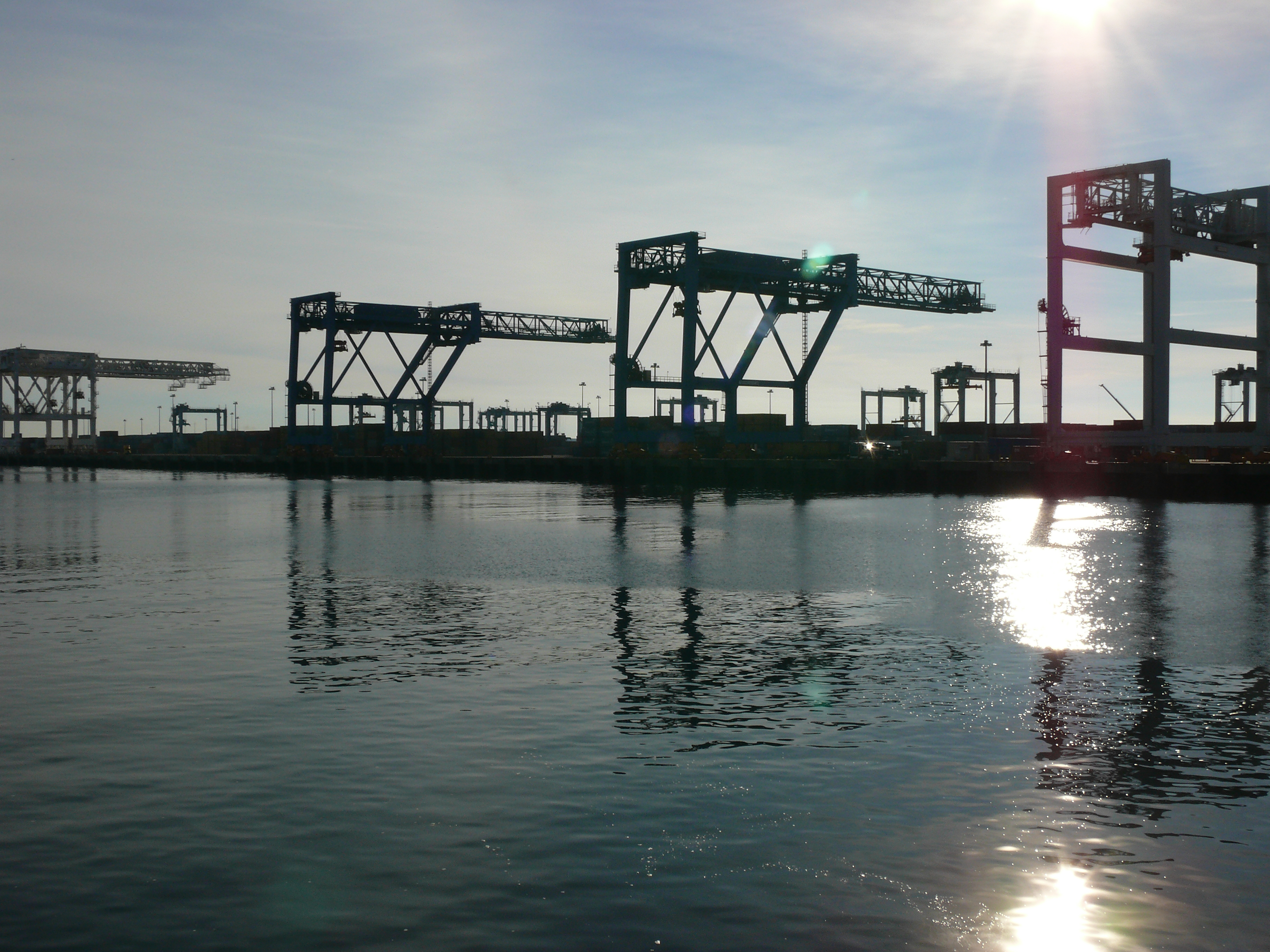
Conley Terminal, photographed from Black Falcon Terminal

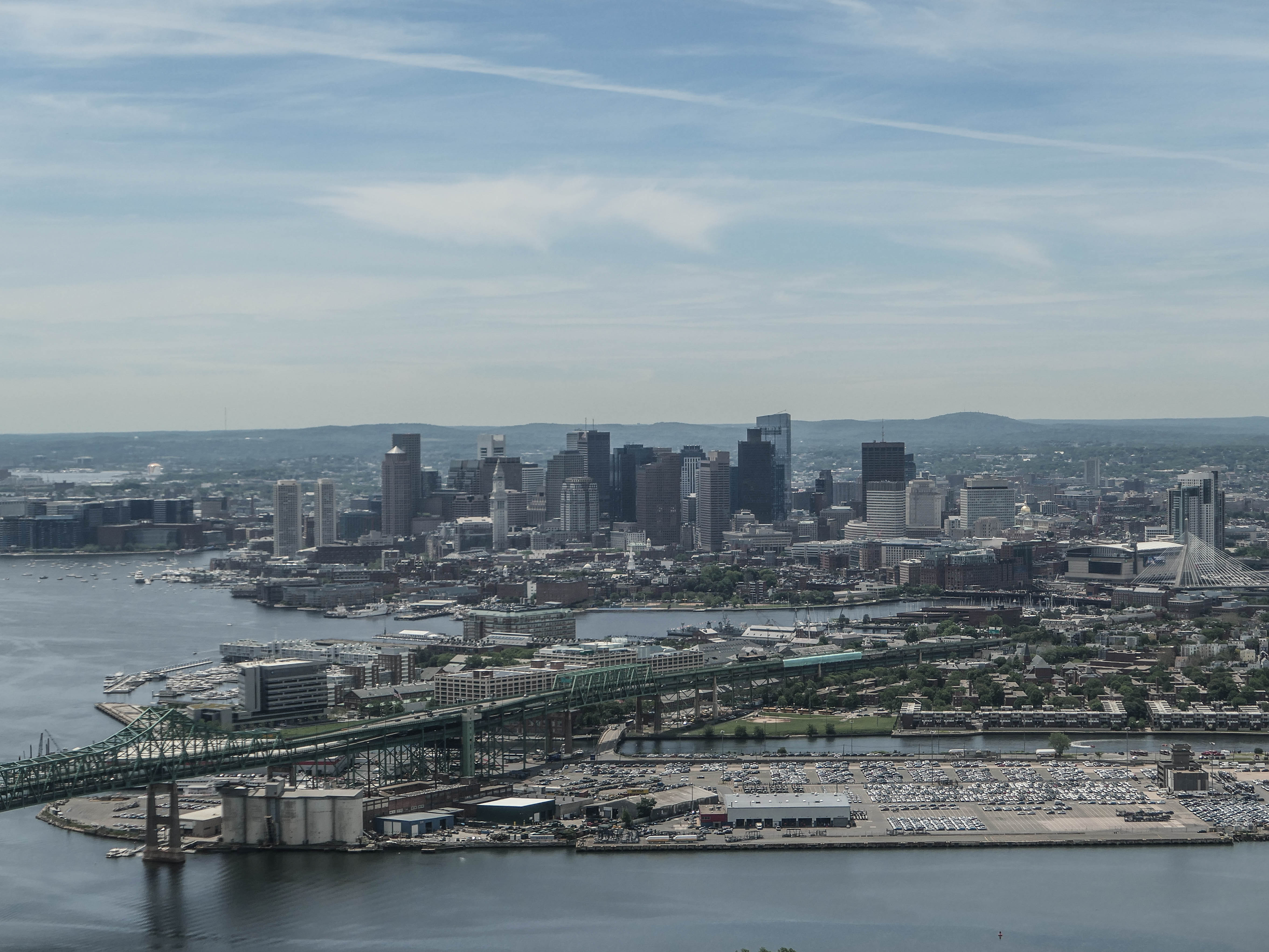
Boston Autoport, Charlestown

The public facilities, operated by the Massport, are located in the neighborhoods of Charlestown, East Boston, and South Boston. These include:

- Flynn Cruiseport Boston (South Boston) - This cruise terminal has been owned and operated by Massport since 1986. Running from April through November, during the 2016 cruise season the port welcomed 114 ships and over 300,000 passengers. Cruise destinations from Boston include Bermuda, Canada, Panama, San Diego, and Europe. Only vessel passengers are authorized to enter the Terminal's restricted areas; however, cruise-ship activity can be viewed from the Summer Street Bridge over the Reserved Channel and the small park at the southern end of the cruise terminal. In May 2017, the terminal was officially named in honor of former Boston mayor Raymond Flynn; it previously had been known as the Black Falcon Cruise Terminal, a former cargo building that had been remodeled in 1980, with additional remodelling and expansion in 2010 and 2015.
- Conley Terminal (South Boston) - This terminal serves as the container facility for the Port of Boston. The terminal itself has been in use since World War II, when it was known as the Castle Island terminal. After Sea-Land pioneered shipping containers in the mid-1960s, Castle Island became one of the first such terminals in the country. Massport built a second container terminal (Moran Container Terminal) in nearby Charlestown in the early 1970s. After Sea-Land's lease ended in 1980, Massport built a larger terminal on the Castle Island site, later named the Paul W. Conley Container Terminal, which opened in 1984. Massport dredged the entrance channel to a depth of 45 feet (14 m) in the mid-1990s. Today, the facility is capable of handling Panamax and post-Panamax container ships. As of 2019, Massport is expanding the facility westward into an adjacent brownfield site once used for oil storage, and has built a new entrance road. In November 2019, it received a $20 million grant from the U.S. Department of Transportation for additional improvements. In calendar year 2018, the terminal handled over 298,000 TEU's, up from 237,166 in 2015. Volumes have dropped dramatically due to the COVID-19 pandemic, but are expected to rebound as supply chain problems resolve and additional carriers serve the port.

In June 2021, the terminal received three new ship-to-shore container cranes built in China, including two that are 205 feet high. In June 2022, the US Army Corps of Engineers completed a $350 million dredging project that will allow post-Panamax ships to dock without waiting for high tide. The CSX railroad's double-stack container terminal in Worcester is an hour and half drive from the terminal. The improvements resulted in additional shipping routes tripling the number of ports that ship goods to and from Conley. The state has proposed extending Track 61 to connect Conley to the national rail network, to eliminate this as a competitive disadvantage compared to other East Coast ports, however land for a container to rail terminal nearby would be difficult to find and present rail clearances won't allow double-stack operations.

- Boston Autoport (Charlestown) - Now dedicated exclusively to the processing and shipping of automobiles, this site once served as the common-use Moran Container Terminal.
- Boston Fish Pier (South Boston) - The oldest continuously operated fish pier in the United States, this facility houses companies dedicated to the processing and shipment of seafood.

=== Non-Massport facilities ===
The Port of Boston has facilities dedicated to bulk cargo, petroleum, and LNG shipment and storage. These are primarily located on the Mystic River, notably along the city of Everett waterfront as well as the Chelsea River area of East Boston, Chelsea, and Revere. The Chelsea River depots also contain facilities handling jet fuel for Logan International Airport. The Deer Island Waste Water Treatment Plant, whose 150-foot-tall (46 m) egg-shaped sludge digesters are major landmarks, sends treated sludge across the harbor via a tunnel for further processing into fertilizer.

The US Coast Guard has a base in Boston, and the sail frigate USS Constitution ("Old Ironsides") is berthed at the former Charlestown Navy Yard, now part of the Boston National Historical Park. The park is also home to the USS Cassin Young, a World War II-era Fletcher-class destroyer and now a museum ship. The park's Drydock Number 1 was completed in 1833 and first used by the Constitution. It is now used to overhaul historic ships, including Constitution in 1992 and Cassin Young in 2007. Two other pre-World War II-era dry docks in the harbor are still operational (as of 2014), including Dry Dock Number 3 — one of the largest dry docks on the U.S. East Coast — which regularly repairs ships for the Military Sealift Command. These are located at the former South Boston Naval Annex.

MBTA ferry, water taxis, and private ferries and small cruise boats also use docks at Rowes Wharf, Central Wharf, Long Wharf, Boston Navy Yard, Logan International Airport, Hewitt's Cove in Hingham, Pemberton Point in Hull, and the Fore River Shipyard in Quincy, and a number of small docks at destinations around the harbor. The Boston Harborwalk provides public access to much of the harbor's edge.

=== Piers and wharves ===
Boston's port was historically served by many more wharves and pier facilities. Although Massport maintain the more notable ones, a handful of docking facilities in the Boston Harbor are maintained by private interests or other state agencies such as DCR. Further, some wharves have been converted to residential condominiums, or hotel accommodations.

The Port's current and former wharves include:

Piers

- Boston Fish Pier
- Commonwealth Pier
- Fan Pier
- Piers Park
- Piers Park Sailing Center
- Windmill Pier

Wharves

- Battery Wharf
- Burroughs Wharf
- Central Wharf
- Children's Wharf
- Commercial Wharf
- Constellation Wharf
- Constitution Wharf
- Flagship Wharf
- Griffin's Wharf
- India Wharf
- Lewis Wharf
- Lincoln Wharf
- Long Wharf
- Lovejoy Wharf
- Rowes Wharf
- Russia Wharf
- Sargent's Wharf
- T Wharf
- Union Wharf

=== Foreign trade zone ===
Massport manages Foreign Trade Zone (FTZ) No. 27, which includes many privately owned and port-owned sites located throughout Suffolk County, Massachusetts.

The following Sub Zones are a part of The Port of Boston FTZ No. 27:

- 27C Lawrence Textile
- 27D GM
- 27E Polaroid
- 27F Polaroid
- 27H Polaroid
- 27I Polaroid
- 27J Polaroid
- 27K Polaroid
- 27L AstraZeneca LP
- 27M Reebok International
- 27N Spectro Coating Corporation d/b/a Claremont Flock, LLC

== Traffic and statistics ==
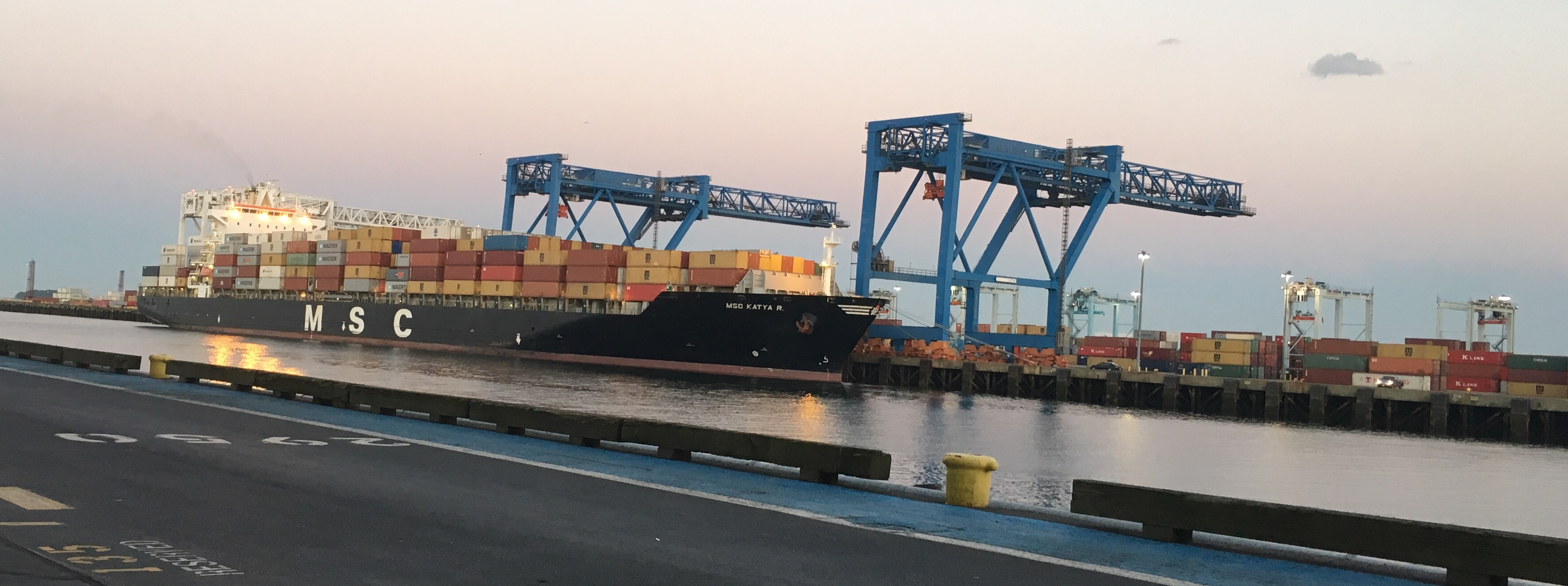
Container ship MSC Katya R. docked at Conley Terminal.

In 2015, the port handled 237,000 container TEUs, 60,000 automobiles, and 121,000 metric tons of cement. Other major forms of cargo processed at the port include petroleum, liquefied natural gas (LNG), gypsum, and salt. There were 328,305 cruise ship passengers that year. Some 114 vessel calls are scheduled for the 2016 cruise season.

In the wake of the September 11, 2001 attacks, there have been concerns about the security of LNG shipments within Boston Harbor, and increased fear of terrorism. Because of the location of the LNG terminal in the Mystic River, tankers traveling to and from the facility are forced to pass directly offshore of downtown Boston. During their voyage through the harbor, they are protected by a security zone that extends 2 miles (3.2 km) in front of the vessel, 1-mile (1.6 km) behind it, and more than half a mile on either side. This zone is enforced by escort vessels provided by the Coast Guard and State Police. The Tobin Bridge is closed as the escort passes under it, and boating is forbidden within the security zone. As of 2005, there have been proposals to construct an offshore LNG facility on either Outer Brewster Island in the harbor, or further afield in the wider Massachusetts Bay.

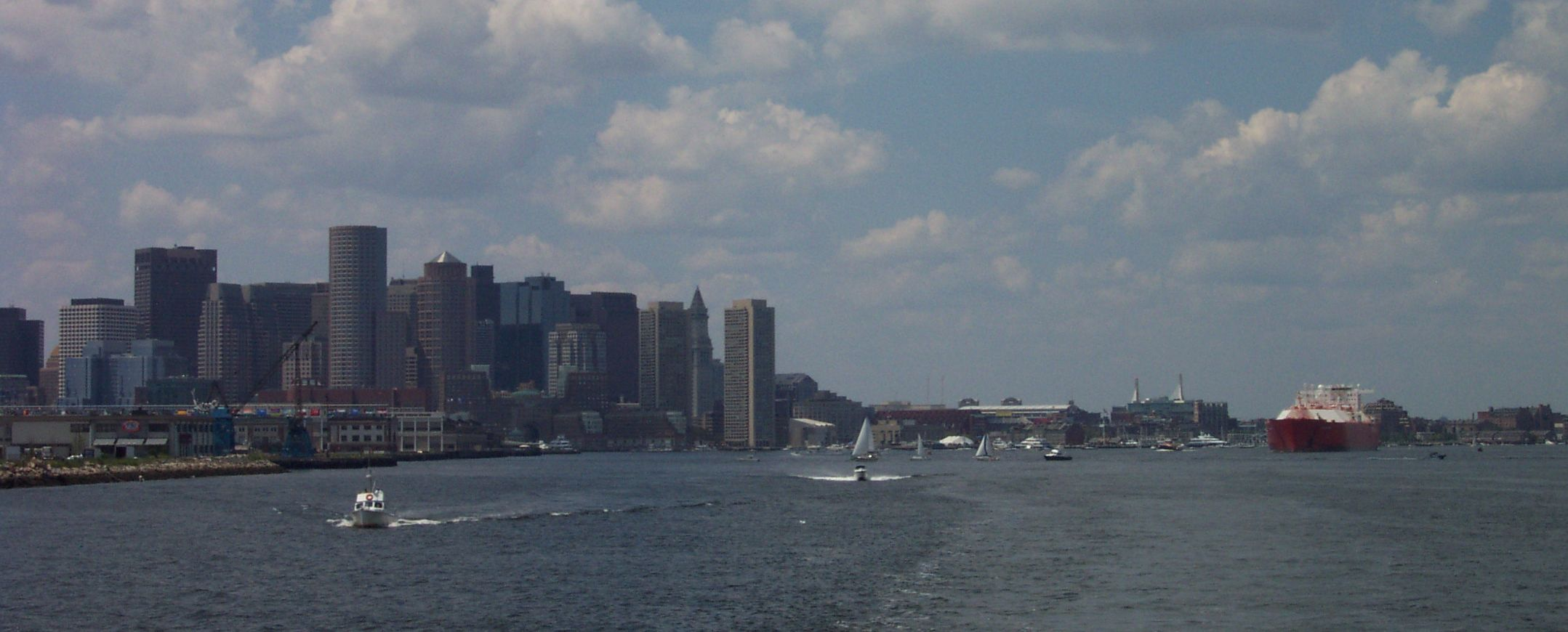
An LNG carrier passes just offshore of downtown Boston, under Coast Guard and police escort.

The MBTA operates commuter boats between Long Wharf and Rowes Wharf on the downtown Boston waterfront to Hingham, Hull, Quincy, and Logan Airport as well as inner harbor ferries between downtown Boston, Charlestown, and South Boston. Other fast passenger ferries operate to Provincetown and Salem. Several companies operate cruise ships on the harbor, whilst water taxis operate from various points on the downtown Boston waterfront, Logan Airport, Charlestown, East Boston, and South Boston. Ferries are also provided for travel amongst the harbor islands.

There are occasionally marine accidents, as with a commuter ferry Massachusetts going from Boston's Rowes Wharf to Hull in June 2006.

== Port Police ==
The Massachusetts Port Authority (Massport), which itself was constituted in 1956 maintains its own police force of POST certified and sworn law enforcement officers of the Commonwealth of Massachusetts. They work in conjunction with the Massachusetts State Police—Troop F who also provide law enforcement services for Massport. Massport police officers also known as "Port Officers" are responsible for physical security and law enforcement at the marine terminals, Boston's Seaport District, East Boston parks and various other properties and lands owned by the authority.

== International seaports agreements ==
- – Port of Dalian, China (2005)
- – Panama Canal Authority, Panama (2005) Memorandum of Understanding (MOU)

== See also ==
- Transportation in Boston
- List of North American ports
- List of ports in the United States
- List of busiest container ports
- United States container ports
