= Jimmy's Harborside Restaurant =

- Interactive map of Jimmy's Harborside Restaurant

Restaurant information
- Established: 1924
- Closed: 2005
- Food type: Seafood
- Location: 242 Northern Avenue, Boston, Massachusetts, United States
- Coordinates: 42°20′56″N 71°02′19″W

Jimmy's Harborside Restaurant was a Boston seafood restaurant on the Boston Fish Pier opened by Jimmy Doulos in 1924. The restaurant closed in 2005 and the building was demolished in 2007. For restaurants in the neighborhood, Jimmy's was a favorite for Julia Child.

When it first opened, it was called Liberty Cafeteria. The name Jimmy's Harborside was not used until 1955.

The Massachusetts Port Authority had plans to redevelop the Fish Pier and was interested in the property as their property totaled 40,000 sq ft (3,700 m^{2}). They came to an agreement with owner Jimmy Doulos and the restaurant would close in a few weeks with the possibility of opening a waterside location at some time in the future. Legal Sea Foods built Legal Harborside on the site.
