= Paul Winthrop Conley =

American amateur boxing champion (1917–1978)

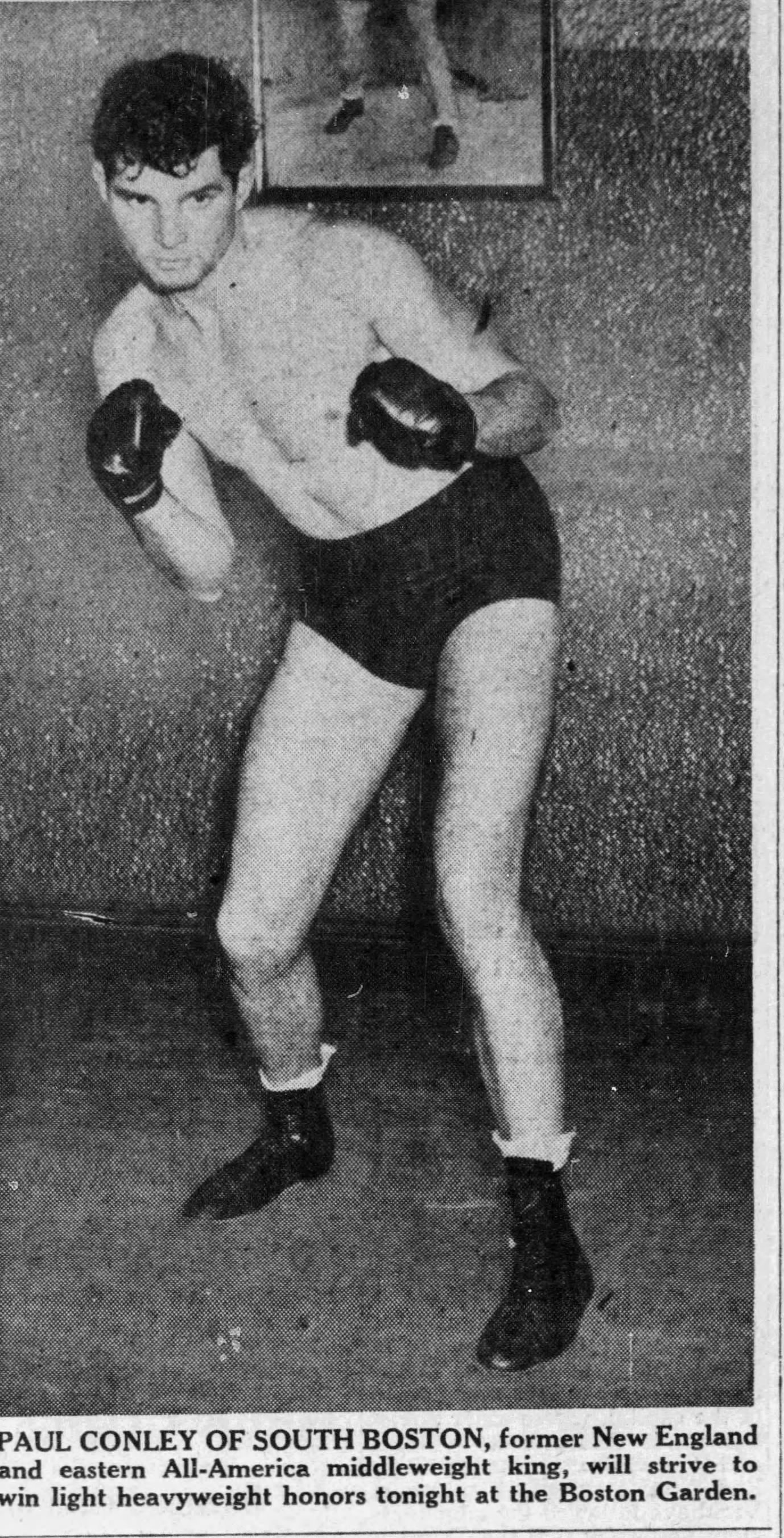
Paul W. Conley in the Boston Globe, December 15, 1941

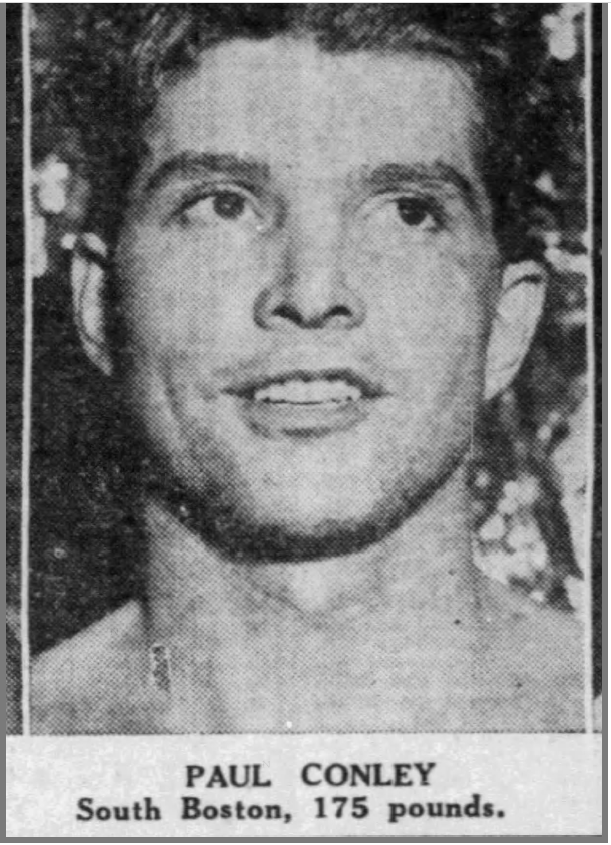
Paul W. Conley in 1942

Paul Winthrop Conley (November 18, 1917 – November 9, 1978) was an amateur boxing champion, a member of the "famed South Boston fighting family". He was also an International Longshoremen’s Association District Council official and a beloved local figure in South Boston, Massachusetts.

== Early life ==
Paul Winthrop Conley was born on November 18, 1917. He was the third son of Lawrence J. ("Larry") Conley and Helen F. (McCarthy) Conley and brother of William G., Robert A. ("Bobby"), Kenneth L. ("Kenney"), Leonard F., Donald F., Lorraine A., and Helen M. Conley. In his youth the family lived in a house at 668 East Sixth Street, South Boston, Massachusetts. Larry Conley was a 1905 welterweight champion. After his boxing career ended, Larry became a boxing manager, trainer, and referee. He worked as a boxing instructor at Cornell University before moving to Massachusetts and becoming a boxing instructor at Harvard. Larry also served as a boxing instructor for several Massachusetts preparatory schools, including Browne & Nichols, Fessenden, and Middlesex. When he died suddenly in 1931 at the age of forty-four, Larry Conley was the boxing coach for the Harvard University Boxing Club. On November 20, 1931, a testimonial concert was held in Larry Conley's honor at the Municipal Building in South Boston, Massachusetts. Larry Conley is often remembered as "one of Boston's best beloved boxing figures" by many boxing fans. Throughout his lifetime, Larry Conley encouraged his sons' interest in boxing. Paul's older brother Bobby also boxed in amateur tournaments. On December 6, 1934, Bobby won the amateur title in the Irish American Athletic Association's boxing show by defeating Walter Gardiner of Providence, Rhode Island. Kenney, another of the brothers, boxed as an amateur boxer during his period of service in the United States Navy during World War II.

== Boxing career ==
Paul W. Conley's boxing career began in 1935. By 1938, he had earned a middleweight title; however, due to a broken thumb he had suffered while defeating Renee Chausse of Taunton, Conley was forced to default the title during the New England sectional finals of the "All America" boxing tournament on December 5, 1938. On December 11, 1939, Paul W. Conley knocked out Joe O'Donnell of Everett, Massachusetts in the middleweight final of the New England "All America" tournament in front of 14,000 spectators in the Boston Garden. The O'Donnell bout was described by Hy Hurwitz of the Boston Globe as the "greatest triumph" of Conley's early career. On the same night, Conley was awarded the District Attorney William J. Foley trophy for his performance. One week later, Conley—by now being described as "the pride of South Boston" with the potential to be "a big local favorite"—secured the Eastern Championship title in the 160 Pound Class of the eastern "All America" middleweight bouts by taking the decision over Joe Conley of Albany, New York before 12,459 spectators in the Boston Garden.

In 1940, Paul W. Conley and the four other members of the eastern "All America" amateur boxing team—Johnny Leonard, Bill Daley, Georges Beckles and Al Priest—participated in the "All America" national finals in San Francisco. Before leaving for the national finals, Conley was honored at a dinner held at the Knocko McCormack's restaurant in South Boston. On December 8, 1941, Paul W. Conley surprised 10,000 spectators in the Boston Garden when he bested National A. A. U. middleweight champion, Jimmy Mulligan of Lowell, Massachusetts, in the 175 Pound Class final of the New England "All-America" amateur tournament. Conley defeated Mulligan by withstanding "a blistering last round rally" and countering with a "staggering right" into Mulligan.

On December 15, 1941, Paul W. Conley was defeated by Jim Rouse of Albany in the semi-final bout in the 175 Pound Class in the eastern finals of the annual "All-America" tournament before 9,000 spectators in the Boston Garden. Conley suffered another loss to Boston's John Pretzie at the Boston Arena on November 23, 1942, leading Pretzie to be awarded the heavyweight title at the 1942 New England "All America" tournament. By the time his amateur boxing career concluded Paul W. Conley had boxed in some two hundred seventy-five bouts and had been seven times a New England Champion.

== Life outside boxing ==
Outside of his amateur boxing career, Paul W. Conley worked as a shipyard worker at the Fore River Shipyard in Quincy, Massachusetts; he later became a longshoreman working at various piers and warehouses in the Port of Boston. In 1942, Conley became a member of the International Longshoremen's Association (ILA); he would later serve on the association's district council for his region. Throughout his career as a longshoreman, Conley was very active in efforts to improve the Port of Boston's working conditions. He also had a lifelong interest in promoting the careers of the youth of the community, and worked with youth-oriented organizations such as the South Boston Social and Athletic Club and the New England AAU.

In 1945, Conley was working as a longshoreman at the South Boston Army Base. After he and some colleagues returned from a three-day strike on March 22 of that year, a shipping company's work gang leader refused to provide them with work, and a fight broke out between the two sides. Three men were injured in the brawl, including Conley, who suffered "lacerations to his left leg". were injured during the fracas. The shipping company's employee was arrested by the Boston Police on an assault charge; none of the injured longshoremen were ever arrested or charged with any crime as a result of the fracas.

In 1948, Paul W. Conley married Constance M. Simmons. The couple had three children: Paul W. Conley, Bruce L. Conley, and Susan J. (Simmons) Conley. The family resided at 756 East Fourth Street in South Boston. On January 28, 1978, Conley was "honored by his many friends at a testimonial" at the Boston Teachers Union Hall.

Paul W. Conley died at his home on November 9, 1978. On April 24, 1979, the Massachusetts General Court designated the Castle Island Terminal at City Point in Southie as the Paul W. Conley terminal. The dedication for the terminal was held on October 11, 1981. At the time that the new facility was dedicated, the Paul W. Conley Terminal was expected to handle twenty thousand containers per year and to expand the Port of Boston's capacity by fifty percent.
