= Thomas Russell (Massachusetts judge) =

American jurist and government official

United States Minister Resident to Venezuela
- In office 1874–1877
- Preceded by: William A. Pile
- Succeeded by: Jehu Baker

Collector of Customs for the Port of Boston
- In office 1867–1874
- Preceded by: Darius N. Couch
- Succeeded by: William A. Simmons

Personal details
- Born: September 26, 1825 Plymouth, Massachusetts
- Died: February 9, 1887 (aged 61) Boston
- Resting place: Burial Hill; Plymouth, Massachusetts
- Party: Republican
- Education: Harvard College; Harvard Law School
- Occupation: Attorney

Thomas Russell (September 26, 1825 – February 9, 1887) was an American jurist and government official who served as Collector of Customs for the Port of Boston, United States Minister Resident to Venezuela, and Massachusetts Commissioner of Railroads.

== Early life ==
Russell was born on September 26, 1825, to Thomas and Mary Ann (Goodwin) Russell. His father served as Treasurer and Receiver-General of Massachusetts. Russell graduated from Harvard College in 1845 and studied law at Harvard Law School and in the office of Jacob H. Loud. In 1847 he moved to Boston and continued his studies in the office of Whiting & Russell. He was admitted to the bar on November 12, 1849.

== Government service ==
On February 26, 1852, Russell was appointed justice of the Boston Police Court. When the Massachusetts Superior Court was created in 1859, Russell was appointed as one of its judges. Russell was known for his harsh sentences against garroters which was credited with deterring similar attacks. During the American Civil War he also served as a draft commissioner.

In 1867, Russell left the bench to become Collector of Customs for the Port of Boston. He resigned in 1874 to become Minister Resident to Venezuela. He remained in Venezuela until 1877, when a report written by Russell stating that the United States would have to use force or bribery to collect on the claims of their citizens against the Venezuelan government was published, resulting in Venezuelan President Antonio Guzmán Blanco breaking off all official relations with Russell and forcing his recall.

Russell was a member of the Massachusetts House of Representatives in 1879. That same year he was appointed chairman of the Massachusetts railroad commission, a position he held until his death.

== Non-government work ==
In 1855, Russell joined the Harvard Board of Overseers. He was also a trustee of the State Reform School for Boys and the Massachusetts Nautical School. From 1879 until his death he was the chairman of the Pilgrim Society. In 1878, Russell became the president of the Emigrant Savings Bank.

== Personal life ==
Russell's wife, Mary Ellen Russell, was the daughter of Edward Thompson Taylor. They had three daughters; Minnie, Nelly, and Dora. Nelly married a Venezuelan general, Alejandro Ybarra, and they had three children who lived to adulthood, including journalist Thomas Russell Ybarra.

Russell was an abolitionist and a member of the Free Soil Party. He was also a member of the Mount Lebanon Lodge and spoke at numerous Freemason assemblies.

Russell died on February 9, 1887, at his home in Boston. He was buried at Burial Hill in Plymouth.
