= William A. Simmons =

Political figure

William A. Simmons (January 20, 1840 – June 28, 1916) was an American political figure who served as Collector of Customs for the Port of Boston and chairman of the Boston water board.

== Early life ==
Simmons was born on January 20, 1840, in Boston's North End. His father died when Simmons was 13 years old and he became the primary provider for his mother and younger siblings. He enlisted in the 44th Massachusetts Infantry Regiment in 1862 and served in the Department of North Carolina for six months during the American Civil War. Although Simmons did not receive much of a formal education, he studied law with Andrew W. Boardman and was admitted to the bar in 1867.

== Politics ==
After his military service ended, Simmons became involved in the Massachusetts Republican Party. He managed the party's efforts in Boston's Ward 2, was a member of the Republican state central committee, and served as chairman of the Republican Ward and City Committee. In 1869 he was an unsuccessful candidate for the Massachusetts Senate.

Simmons joined the Bureau of Internal Revenue as a special treasury agent in 1865 and from 1870 to 1874 he was supervisor of internal revenue in New England. He was supervisor during the Sanborn incident and would testify before the Senate that he had assigned a revenue detective to assist John B. Sanborn in his collection of delinquent taxes on the instructions of the United States Secretary of the Treasury George S. Boutwell and assistant secretary William Adams Richardson.

After Thomas Russell resigned as Collector of Customs for the Port of Boston, Benjamin Butler lobbied for Simmons to get the job. George Frisbie Hoar wrote that the "National executive patronage in Massachusetts seemed given up to advancing the personal fortunes of General Butler" and that Simmons' nomination excited a "deep indignation". Numerous newspapers, including The Boston Globe, The Boston Journal, and the Boston Daily Advertiser, as well as many of the city's businessmen opposed Simmons' nomination. Merchant Edward W. Kinsley told The Boston Globe that although Simmons was "a man possessed of undoubted talents", he knew "nothing about the duties" of the office of Collector and was "unfit to be collector by training, experience, and probably capacity". However, The Boston Globe also reported that the majority of dispatches received by Senators George S. Boutwell and Charles Sumner were in favor of Simmons. Both Boutwell and Sumner spoke in opposition to the nomination and voted against his confirmation. However, Boutwell's speech was described by The New York Times as "not very earnest" and seen as aiding Simmons. The Senate confirmed Simmons by a vote of 27 to 17. His term ended in 1878 and he was succeeded by Alanson W. Beard. After leaving office, Simmons worked in the manufacturing and mining businesses, helped found the Boston Evening Star, and served as president of the Massachusetts Benefit Life Association.

In 1883, Simmons was appointed chairman of the Boston water board by mayor Albert Palmer. In 1885, mayor Hugh O'Brien removed Simmons after the Boston Daily Advertiser reported on a real estate deal approved by Simmons in which the water department purchased land for the Fisher Hill Reservoir from George A. Wilson for $91,934, four days after Wilson purchased it for $41,445. Shortly after the sale, Simmons was seen with $31,312 in his possession. An investigative committee chaired by alderman Thomas N. Hart found that Simmons knew that the land could have been purchased for less and had received profits from the sale. The city sued Wilson and Simmons for money lost in the Fisher Hill transaction, however the judge overseeing the case sustained a demurrer from the defendants, resulting in the dismissal of the city's lawsuit. The demurrer was overturned by the Massachusetts Supreme Judicial Court in 1890.

== Later life ==
Simmons left Boston after his removal from the water board. He was involved in mining and real estate in New York for a time and in 1896 moved to Chicago, where he was an agent and representative of the Clark Thread Company. In 1896, Simmons acquired an apartment building worth $135,000 from Thomas Barbour Bryan in exchange for 6,000 acres in Florida that had little value. Bryan stated that Simmons had led him to believe that the property was being deeded to the Clark Thread Company and accused him of fraud. Simmons was indicted on charges of obtaining signatures and property by false pretenses. He was found guilty, but his conviction was overturned by the Supreme Court of Illinois. Simmons died on June 28, 1916, in Chicago.

== Footnotes ==
Government offices
Preceded by Thomas Russell	Collector of Customs for the Port of Boston; 1874–1878	Succeeded by Alanson W. Beard
