= William Reimann =

Biography of mid-century constructivist artist William P. Reimann

- Born: William Page Reimann; November 29, 1935 (age 90); Minneapolis, MN
- Education: Yale University
- Known for: Sculpture
- Movement: Organic Abstraction, Constructivism

William Page Reimann (born 1935) is an American sculptor and arts educator, known for his large plexiglas and steel sculptures, stonework, metalwork, and figurative graphite and ink drawings. He was among the handful of "pioneering" sculptors who brought plastic materials to the New York art scene in the 1960s. In stone, his notable public works include the Radnor Gateway Project for the Blue Route in Radnor, PA, and the twenty-four granite panel series of the Piers Park Commons Pavilion in East Boston, MA.

He taught design, sculpture, and drawing at Harvard University, in Cambridge, MA (1968-2002). His works are the permanent collection of MOMA, the Whitney Museum of American Art, the National Gallery of Art (J.D. Hatch Collection of American Drawings), the Boston Museum of Fine Arts, and numerous private collections.

== Early life and education ==
Reimann was born in Minneapolis, MN, to Hobart Reimann and Dorothy Sampson. He attended Yale College, graduating in 1957, and joined Yale Graduate School of Design, headed during that period by Josef Albers, for his MFA. In the spring of 1959, his work was selected for the MOMA Exhibition, Recent Sculpture USA. The exhibition toured the United States during the summer of 1959, with stops at the Denver Museum of Fine Arts, the Los Angeles County Museum, the City Art Museum of St. Louis, and the Boston Museum of Fine Arts.

== Art career ==
The "clean precision" of Reimann's work was well-timed for the "cool, streamlined beauty of postwar industrialism." His work in Plexiglas from the 1960s has been described as taking a position "somewhere between the constructivism of Gabo's plastic sculptures and the organic abstraction of pieces by Arp and Brâncuși." He found further success during the 1970s and 1980s in corporate commissions for companies like Shell Oil, Southwestern Bell, and Tropicana.

Reimann's works are in many media and forms, including two dimensional works on paper and mylar, and sculpture and furniture in glass, stone and wood. His method of using steel and Plexiglas was highly labor-intensive. Reimann, like mentor Robert Engman, did not believe in the factory approach to sculpture, preferring to personally construct his pieces. Because of the physical demands of the hand labor, he would only accept commissions for high large-scale corporate pieces in Plexiglas on a limited basis.

In the 1980s, he turned from Plexiglas to stone, with his first public art commission, Arrival Stelae, a series of six granite bollards for the Arts on the Line project in Porter Square, Cambridge, MA.

== Teaching ==
After a stint at Old Dominion University as part of the Arts Faculty, Reimann moved to Harvard University, where he taught basic drawing, design, and sculpture in the VES Department (1968-2003) as Senior Preceptor in Visual Studies. His students and those he brought on as teaching staff include life coach Martha Beck, artist Lewis Bryden, animator Frank Mouris, and musician Dan Wilson.

== Rowing ==
Reimann is a lifetime rower since his schoolboy days in Pennsylvania. His competitive career ended in 2014, following diagnosis of a heart arrhythmia. National Champion in the Association Single in 1956 (a year in which Jack Kelly Jr. took the National Championship in the Senior Single), his numerous rowing achievements include a (since surpassed) Head of the Charles Regatta course record as the 1988 Champion, Grand Master single.

== Exhibitions ==
=== Group ===
Recent Sculpture USA (1959) MOMA, New York
Plastics USA, (1960-61) USIA traveling exhibition to Russia
Structured Sculpture (1960) Galerie Chalette, New York
Geometric Abstraction in America (1962) Whitney Museum of American Art
Young Americans (1965) Whitney Museum of American Art
White on White: Paintings, Prints, Sculpture (Oct - Nov 1965) deCordova Museum and Sculpture Park Lincoln, MA
Annual Exhibition 1966: Contemporary Sculpture and Prints (Dec 1966 - Feb 1967), Whitney Museum of American Art (1961, 1962, 1963, 1964, 1966)
Herbert and Nannette Rothschild Collection: an exhibition in celebration of the seventy-fifth anniversary of the founding of Pembroke College in Brown University (1966) Brown University Art Museum, Providence, RI
Structured Sculpture (1968) Galerie Chalette
National Invitational Exhibition of Drawings by College Art Instructors (1974) Southern Illinois University Carbondale, IL
National Endowment for the Arts Purchase Exhibition (1977) Schenectady Museum, Schenectady, NY
Arts on the Line: Works of Art Commissioned by the Massachusetts Bay Transit Authority (1980) Hayden Gallery, MIT, Cambridge, MA
Josef Albers, His Art & His Influence, (1981-82) Montclair Art Museum, Montclair, NJ

=== Solo ===
"Recent Drawings by William P. Reimann" (1970) The Norfolk Museum of Arts and Sciences, Norfolk, VA
"William P. Reimann, Sculpture and Drawings" (1975) State University of New York, College at Cortland, NY

== Synopsis ==
- William Reimann (born 1935) - Organic Abstractionist / Constructivist Sculptor. In the permanent collection of MOMA and the Whitney, major exhibitions at same. Retrospective of the artist at 72.
