= G. Edward Bradley =

American politician

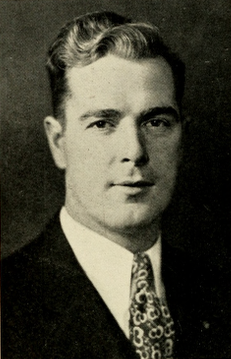

Member of the Massachusetts Governor's Council for the 6th District
- In office 1965–1975
- Preceded by: Joseph Ray Crimmins
- Succeeded by: Vincent LoPresti

Member of the Massachusetts House of Representatives 24rd Middlesex District
- In office 1953–1965

24th Mayor of Somerville, Massachusetts
- In office 1943 – January 1950
- Preceded by: John M. Lynch
- Succeeded by: John M. Lynch

Personal details
- Born: October 21, 1906 Somerville, Massachusetts, U.S.
- Died: September 24, 1993 (aged 86) Centerville, Massachusetts, U.S.
- Party: Democratic
- Spouse: Helen A.
- Children: Nancy Bradley; G. Edward Bradley Jr., James H. Bradley, Maureen E. Bradley, Robert R. Bradley, Lawrence J. Bradley, and John D. Bradley.
- Education: Fordham University, Massachusetts College of Optometry
- Profession: Optometrist

George Edward Bradley (October 21, 1906 – September 24, 1993) was an American optometrist and politician who served on the Massachusetts Governor's Council, in the Massachusetts House of Representatives and as the 24th Mayor of Somerville, Massachusetts.

== See also ==
- Massachusetts legislature: 1937–1938, 1939, 1953–1954, 1955–1956

== Notes ==
Political offices
Preceded by John M. Lynch	24th Mayor of Somerville, Massachusetts; January 1945 – January 1950	Succeeded by John M. Lynch
