= Maynard Hutchinson =

Maynard W. Hutchinson (September 15, 1885 – September 12, 1963) was a political figure who served as collector of customs for the Port of Boston.

== Early life ==
Hutchinson was born on September 15, 1885, in Allston to George Hutchinson and Eliza Maynard Clark. He graduated from Newton High School and in 1908 earned a Bachelor of Arts from Harvard College in 1908.

== Business career ==
Hutchinson worked as a shoe manufacturer before going into the investment business. For many years he worked for Loomis, Sayles & Company.

Hutchinson was also a director of the New England Mutual Life Insurance Company and director of the Boston Better Business Bureau.

== Philanthropy ==
From 1929 to 1932, Hutchinson was president of the Norumbega Boy Scout Council. From 1935 to 1938, he was president of the Newton Community Chest. During World War II, Hutchinson was general chairman of the United War Fund of Greater Boston.

Hutchinson also served as president and chairman of Boys' and Girls' Camps, Inc. and a trustee of Northeastern University.

== Politics ==
Hutchinson was a member of the Newton Board of Aldermen from 1933 to 1939. He later served as chairman of the Massachusetts Republican Party's finance committee. Hutchinson was an important fundraiser for Dwight D. Eisenhower during his 1952 presidential campaign. He was chairman of the dinner committee for Eisenhower that filled the Boston Garden in 1952.

== Collector of customs ==
Hutchinson served as collector of customs for the Port of Boston from 1954 to 1961. He was sworn into office on April 30, 1954, by former Governor Robert F. Bradford in a ceremony at the Boston Custom House.

== Personal life and death ==
Hutchinson married Helen Sophia Knowlton of Marion, Massachusetts, on May 22, 1909. They had three children. Mrs. Hutchinson died in 1943.

Hutchinson married Linda McLain Hawkridge on December 31, 1956.

Hutchinson died on September 12, 1963, at his home in Chestnut Hill, Massachusetts.

Government offices
Preceded by Carroll Meins	Collector of Customs for the Port of Boston; 1954–1961	Succeeded by Peter W. Princi
