= William H. Burke Jr. =

American politician (1906–1975)

William H. Burke Jr. (1906–1975) was an American political figure who served as chairman of the Massachusetts Democratic Party and Collector of Customs for the Port of Boston.

== Early life ==
Burke was born in 1906 to William H. Burke Sr. and Della Maloney Burke in Hatfield, Massachusetts. He attended Smith Academy and St. John's Preparatory School.

Burke began his political involvement in 1934 when he assisted James Michael Curley during his successful run for Governor of Massachusetts. During Curley's tenure as Governor, Burke worked as a placement officer in the State Public Works Department.

In 1938 he ran for Treasurer and Receiver-General of Massachusetts. He finished fifth in an eight-candidate Democratic primary.

== Chairman of the Massachusetts Democratic Party ==
On September 16, 1939, Burke was unanimously elected chairman of the Massachusetts Democratic Party. At the time of his election he was 33 years old and working as a farmer in Hatfield. He resigned on December 9, 1944, after he was named Collector of Customs for the Port of Boston.

== Collector of Customs for the Port of Boston ==
In 1944, Burke was appointed Collector of Customs for the Port of Boston by president Franklin D. Roosevelt. Burke was confirmed by the United States Senate on November 23, 1944, and sworn in on December 17, 1944. He resigned in 1952 after Republican Dwight D. Eisenhower was elected president.

== Return as chairman ==
In 1952 Burke challenged John C. Carr for the chairmanship of the Massachusetts Democratic Party. Although Carr was declared the winner, Burke challenged the result in court. In 1956, the Massachusetts Supreme Judicial Court ruled that Carr was not legally elected and Burke became party chairman. Burke was supported by House Majority Leader John William McCormack, but opposed by Senator John F. Kennedy. Kennedy opposed Burke because Kennedy supported Adlai Stevenson for the party's presidential nomination in 1956 while Burke supported McCormack. Kennedy supported John M. Lynch for the position of chairman because he was a Stevenson supporter, but not too close to Kennedy. Kennedy felt that if someone who was close to him personally was chosen as chairman, it would appear that Burke was removed for personal gain and not to better the party. Burke was defeated by Lynch 47 votes to 31 at the 1956 convention.

== Death ==
Burke died on April 17, 1975, after suffering a heart attack at his home in Hatfield.

Party political offices
Preceded by Joseph McGrath; John C. Carr	Chairman of the Massachusetts Democratic Party; 1939–1944; 1956	Succeeded by John F. Cahill; John M. Lynch
Government offices
Preceded by Joseph McGrath	Collector of Customs for the Port of Boston; 1944–1952	Succeeded by Carroll Meins
