= John M. Lynch =

American politician

25th Mayor of Somerville, Massachusetts
- In office January 1950 – January 1954
- Preceded by: G. Edward Bradley
- Succeeded by: William J. Donovan

23rd Mayor of Somerville, Massachusetts
- In office January 3, 1938 – 1943
- Preceded by: Leslie E. Knox
- Succeeded by: G. Edward Bradley

Personal details
- Died: November 14, 1984 (aged 84) Somerville, Massachusetts, U.S.
- Party: Democratic
- Education: College of the Holy Cross (BA)
- Profession: Insurance broker
- Nickname: Pat

John M. "Pat" Lynch was an American politician who served as the twenty-third and twenty-fifth Mayor of Somerville, Massachusetts. He was the Massachusetts Democratic Party Chair from 1956 to 1962.

== Early life and career ==
Lynch grew up in Somerville and graduated from the College of the Holy Cross in 1926. In 1929 he was elected to the Somerville Board of Aldermen by seven votes. He would serve a total of three terms as Alderman.

== Mayor of Somerville ==
In 1938, Lynch became Mayor of Somerville. He remained in office until 1943, when he resigned to join the United States Navy. During World War II he served as a lieutenant commander in the Caribbean. From 1950 to 1953 he once again served as mayor. He became the first five-term mayor in the history of Somerville.

== Chairman of the Massachusetts Democratic Party ==
Lynch supported John F. Kennedy during his first run for the United States House of Representatives. In 1956, at Kennedy's request, Lynch ran for and was elected state party chairman. Kennedy supported Lynch for the position because he, like Kennedy, supported Adlai Stevenson for the party's presidential nomination in 1956, but was not too close to Kennedy. Kennedy felt that if someone who was close to him personally was chosen as chairman, it would appear that chairman William H. Burke, Jr. was removed for personal gain and not to better the party. Lynch defeated Burke by 47 votes to 31 at the 1956 convention.

As chairman, Lynch laid much of the groundwork for Kennedy's 1960 presidential campaign in Massachusetts and traveled with him throughout most of the primary states.

== Customs collector ==
In 1962, Lynch was appointed collector of customs in the Port of Boston. He was later offered the position of customs collector for all of New England by President Lyndon B. Johnson but declined and instead chose to retire.

== Death ==
Lynch died on November 14, 1984, in Somerville.

== Notes ==
Political offices
Preceded by Leslie E. Knox	23rd Mayor of Somerville, Massachusetts; January 3, 1938 – 1943	Succeeded by G. Edward Bradley
Preceded by G. Edward Bradley	25th Mayor of Somerville, Massachusetts; January 1950 – January 1954	Succeeded by William J. Donovan
Party political offices
Preceded by William H. Burke, Jr.	Chairman of the Massachusetts Democratic Party; 1956–1962	Succeeded by Gerard F. Doherty
Government offices
Preceded by Peter W. Princi	Collector of Customs for the Port of Boston; 1962–1966	Succeeded by Position eliminated
