= Carroll Meins =

American politician

Carroll L. Meins
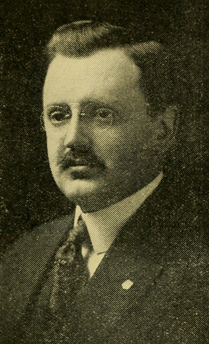
- Carroll L. Meins, member of Massachusetts House of Representatives

Chair of the Massachusetts Department of Public Utilities
- In office 1940–1945
- Preceded by: Joseph R. Cotton
- Succeeded by: Thomas A. Flaherty
- In office 1947–1947
- Preceded by: Hirsh Freed
- Succeeded by: Edward N. Gadsby

Personal details
- Born: Carroll Leach Meins; October 22, 1892 Boston, Massachusetts
- Died: September 14, 1953 (aged 60)
- Party: Republican

Carroll Leach Meins was a political figure who served as a member of the Massachusetts House of Representatives, Chairman of the Massachusetts Republican Party, and Collector of Customs for the Port of Boston.

== Early life ==
Meins was born on October 22, 1892, in Boston. He attended Boston Public Schools and graduated from the High School of Commerce in 1911.

During World War I, Meins enlisted as a first lieutenant in the Quartermaster Corps of the United States Army. He served eighteen months in the American Expeditionary Forces in France.

After the war, Meins served as treasurer of the Sparrow and Meins Chocolate Company.

== Political career ==
=== State representative ===
Meins was a member of the Massachusetts House of Representatives from 1923 to 1929. During his tenure he was chairman of the House Committee on Taxation and was a member of the Committee on Rules.

=== Party leader ===
In 1937 he was elected chairman of the Boston Republican Committee.

On May 4, 1938, Meins was elected chairman of the state Republican Party. During his tenure as Chairman, Republican Leverett Saltonstall was elected Governor of Massachusetts. Saltonstall chose Meins to serve as Secretary to the Governor. He was succeeded as party chairman by George W. Schryver on December 14, 1938.

=== Saltonstall administration ===
Meins served as chief secretary to Governor Saltonstall from January 5, 1939, to December 11, 1940, when he accepted an appointment to the State Public Utilities Commission.

=== Bradford administration ===
In 1947, Meins was appointed by Robert F. Bradford to head the newly created Metropolitan Transit Authority. Although Meins had a ten-year term, on January 5, 1949, he and the four other members of the Metropolitan Transit Authority Board of Trustees resigned, as they believed incoming Governor Paul A. Dever was entitled to appoint his own board. Dever had been expected to remove the trustees, as the MTA system had run a $9 million deficit under their leadership.

== Collector of Customs ==
In 1953, Meins was appointed by President Dwight D. Eisenhower to serve as Collector of Customs for the Port of Boston. He died on September 14, 1953, at Massachusetts General Hospital in Boston.

== See also ==
- 1923–1924 Massachusetts legislature
- 1925–1926 Massachusetts legislature
- 1927–1928 Massachusetts legislature

Party political offices
| Preceded by Sinclair Weeks | Chairman of the Massachusetts Republican Party; 1938 | Succeeded by George W. Schryver |
Government offices
| Preceded by William H. Burke, Jr. | Collector of Customs for the Port of Boston; 1953 | Succeeded by Maynard Hutchinson |
