= Peter W. Princi =

American judge

Peter W. Princi (November 7, 1915 – August 10, 1984) was an attorney who served as Collector of Customs for the Port of Boston and as a United States magistrate judge.

== Early life ==
Princi was born on November 7, 1915, to Joseph M. and Teresa M. Princi, immigrants from Reggio Calabria, Italy. His father worked as a tailor on Newbury Street in Boston. Princi had three brothers, one of whom was actor Carl Princi.

Princi graduated from Northeastern University School of Law in 1938 and began practicing law in 1940. During World War II he was a first lieutenant in the Army Intelligence Corps in Italy, Sicily and North Africa. From 1949 to 1959 he was a member of the board of directors and secretary of the Lincoln Settlement House in Boston's South End.

== Political involvement ==
Princi was an active member of the Democratic Party. He was a delegate to the state Democratic convention in 1954 and an alternate delegate to the 1956 and 1960 Democratic National Conventions. He was close to President John F. Kennedy.

Princi also served on a number of boards in his hometown of Winthrop, Massachusetts. He was a member of the Finance Committee, chairman of the board of selectmen, and Town Counsel. In 1960 he was president of the City Solicitors and Town Counsel Association of Massachusetts.

== Legal career ==
From 1961 to 1971, Princi was a senior partner of the Boston law firm of Princi and Lecomte. In 1964 he also served as assistant district attorney for Suffolk County.

== Collector of Customs ==
On September 13, 1961, Princi was appointed Collector of Customs for the Port of Boston by President John F. Kennedy. He received his commission from President Kennedy on September 29 in a ceremony held at Hammersmith Farm, the home of Kennedy's mother-in-law. He was sworn into office the following day by Walter A. Van Dalla, chairman of the Winthrop Board of Selectmen, at Winthrop Town Hall.

While serving as Customs Collector, Princi worked 60 to 70 hours a week and continued to work at his law practice. During his tenure Logan International Airport became a port of entry for foreign airfreight.

Princi resigned in 1962 and was succeeded by state Democratic party chairman John M. Lynch.

== Northeastern University ==
Princi was president of the Northeastern University Alumni Association from 1963 to 1964. In 1971 he was given an honorary Doctor of Laws degree from the University. From 1975 to 1984 he was a member of the Member of the Northeastern University Corporation.

== United States magistrate ==
In February 1971 Princi was sworn in as a United States magistrate judge by Charles Edward Wyzanski, Jr., chief judge of the District of Massachusetts. Princi was a member of the first group of magistrates for the Massachusetts District.

Princi's most famous case was the bail and legal preliminaries involved in the Daniel Ellsberg case. Princi recommended that Ellsberg be removed to California to face the indictment charging him with possession of the Pentagon Papers. He also presided over Susan Edith Saxe's appearance in federal court under a federal warrant, the arraignment of former state senator James A. Kelly, Jr., and set bail for the local PATCO president for his part in the 1981 air traffic controller strike.

Princi retired as a magistrate in 1981. After leaving the bench, he worked at his son's law firm.

== Personal life and death ==
Princi was married to Dorothy (Vitagliano) Princi from 1940 until her death in 1975. They had five children.

Princi died in his sleep on August 10, 1984, at the home of one of his daughters in Centerville, Massachusetts. He had resided there for ten years prior to his death.

Government offices
Preceded by Position created	U. S. Magistrate; 1971–1983	Succeeded by Robert B. Collings
Preceded by Maynard Hutchinson	Collector of Customs for the Port of Boston; 1961–1962	Succeeded by John M. Lynch
