= Piers Park Sailing Center =

Community sailing organization in Boston, United States

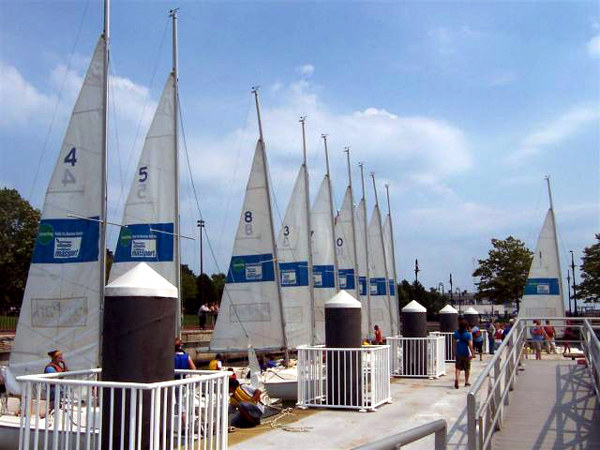
- The Center's sailboats docked in Boston Harbor
- Founded: 1995
- Type: Educational non-profit
- Location(s): 95 Marginal Street East Boston, Massachusetts, United States
- Coordinates: 42.364829°N 71.037786°W
- Website: piersparksailing.org

Piers Park Sailing Center is a 501(c)(3) non-profit community sailing organization located at 95 Marginal Street in East Boston, Massachusetts. The sailing center utilizes Boston Harbor and offers programs for a variety of ages and skill levels.

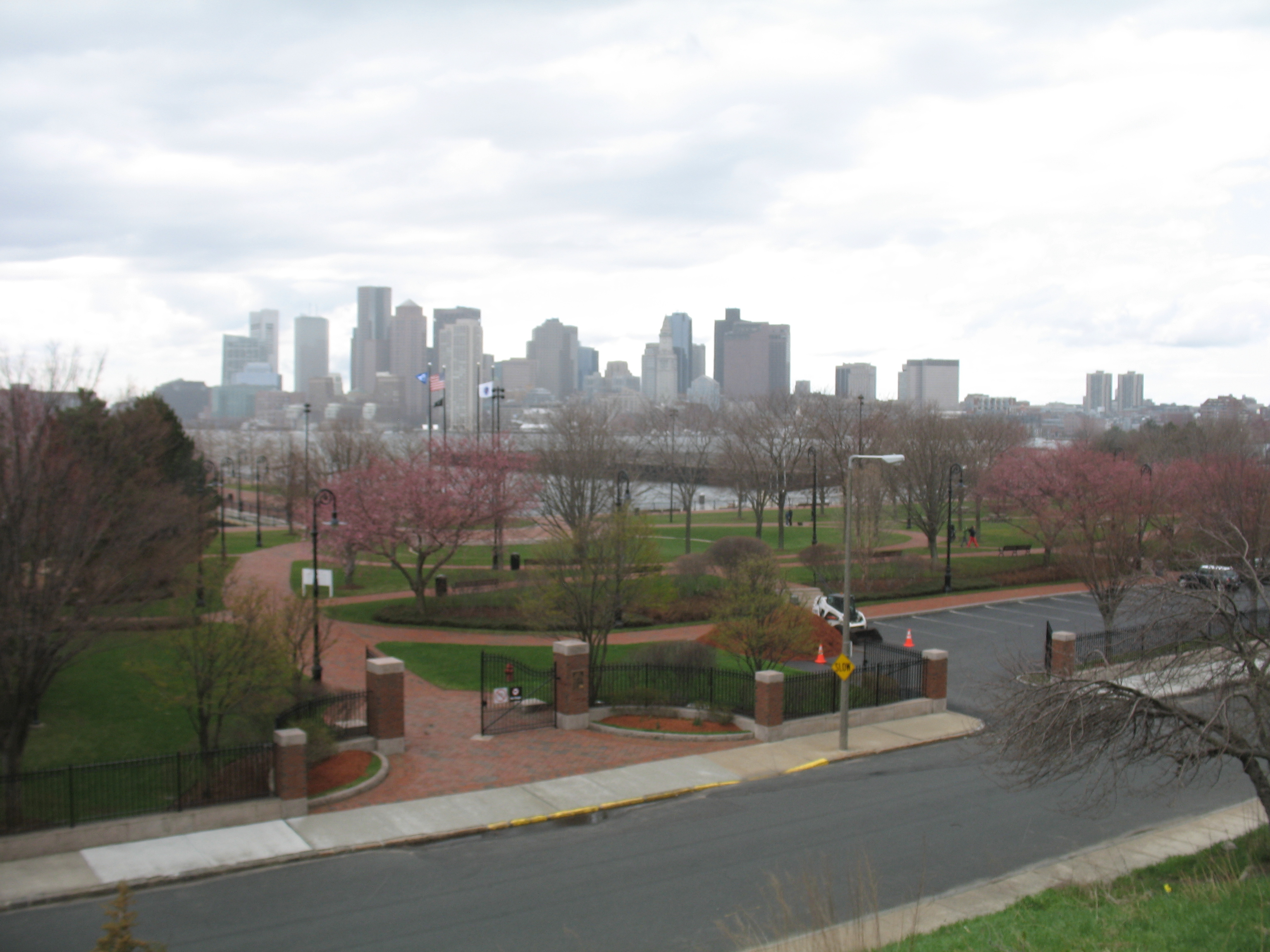
Piers Park, with the downtown Boston skyline in the distance

== History ==
Piers Park, located in the Jeffries Point neighborhood of East Boston, was constructed by the Massachusetts Port Authority in 1995 to allow residents access to the waterfront. Designed by Pressley Associates Landscape Architects, the park incorporates historic seawalls dating from 1870. The facility for the sailing center was constructed shortly thereafter, but its sailing programs did not begin until 1997.

The sailing center has a fleet of eighteen 23-foot Sonar keelboats.

== Programs ==
Youth - With an enrollment of approximately 1,900 children, the Youth program is the largest program at the center. The programs serves children from Logan Airport impacted communities, children from low-income families, and children with disabilities. Summer programs and after school programs enroll children between ages 6–18. In the summer, every Friday, the Science of Sailing Program visits a Boston Harbor Island.

Adult - The Adult program allows adults to reserve boats for sailing with family and friends. The program includes a "Learn to Sail" course for adults. The curriculum is taught in seven classes by certified US Sailing instructors. Upon completion of the course, each student is evaluated and granted both membership and a US Sailing keelboat certification.

Adaptive - The Adaptive program provides lessons for students with disabilities of all ages. The instructors use equipment to adapt the boats for the needs of each individual student.
