= Boston Fish Pier =

Buildings and pier in Boston, Massachusetts

- Boston Fish Pier Historic District
- U.S. National Register of Historic Places
- U.S. Historic district
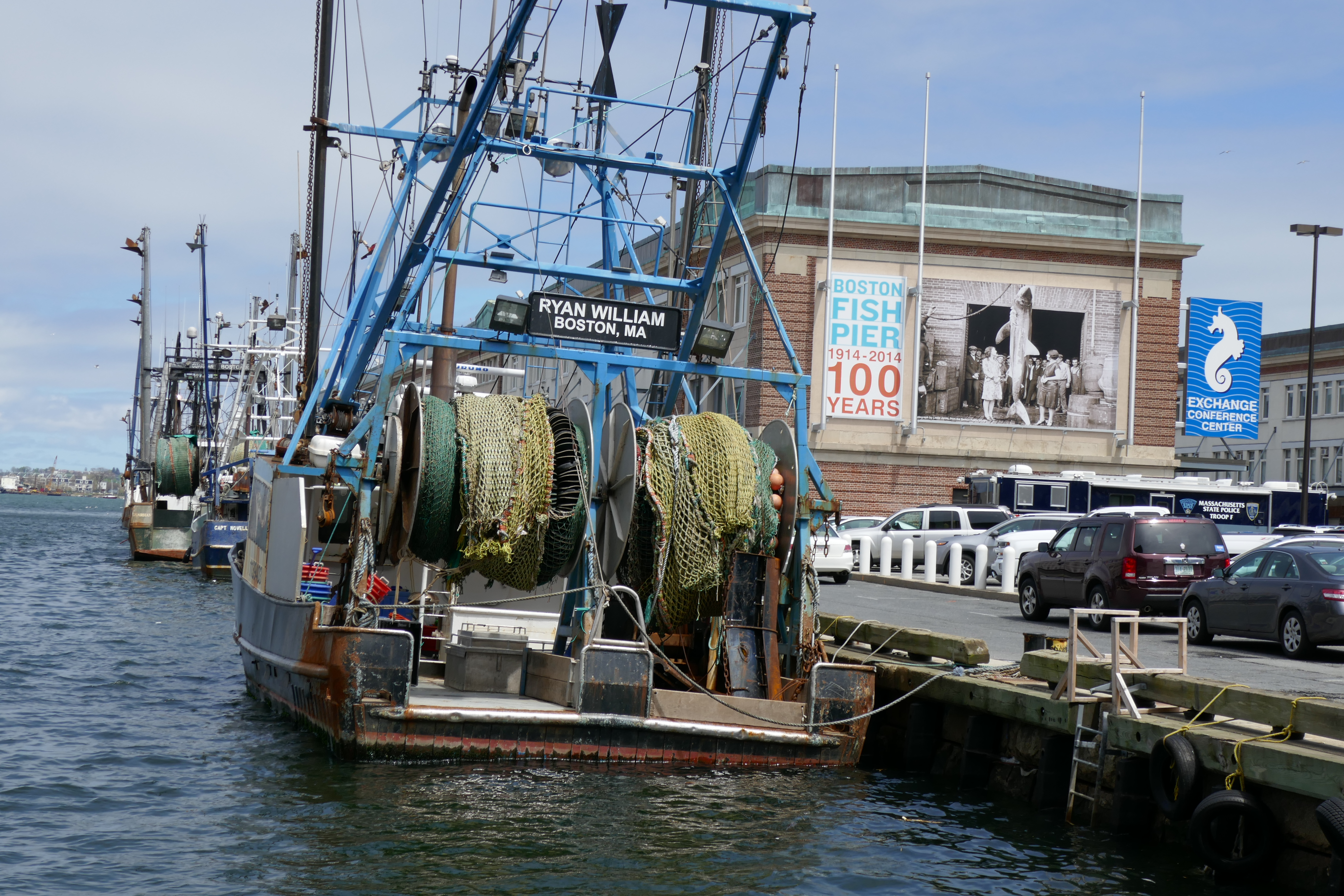
- Location: Northern Ave., South Boston, Massachusetts
- Coordinates: 42°20′57″N 71°2′22″W
- Built: 1910
- Architects: Henry F. Keyes; Monks & Johnson
- NRHP reference No.: 100001314
- Added to NRHP: July 13, 2017

The Boston Fish Pier is the central site for the fishing industry based in Boston, Massachusetts. Located on Northern Avenue in South Boston in Boston's Inner Harbor, the pier has played this role since its establishment in 1910. In the 1920s, it was home to one of the largest fishing fleets in the eastern United States, processing 250 million pounds of fish. The pier and its associated buildings were listed on the National Register of Historic Places in 2017.

This building is currently under consideration for Boston Landmark status by the Boston Landmarks Commission.

== Description ==
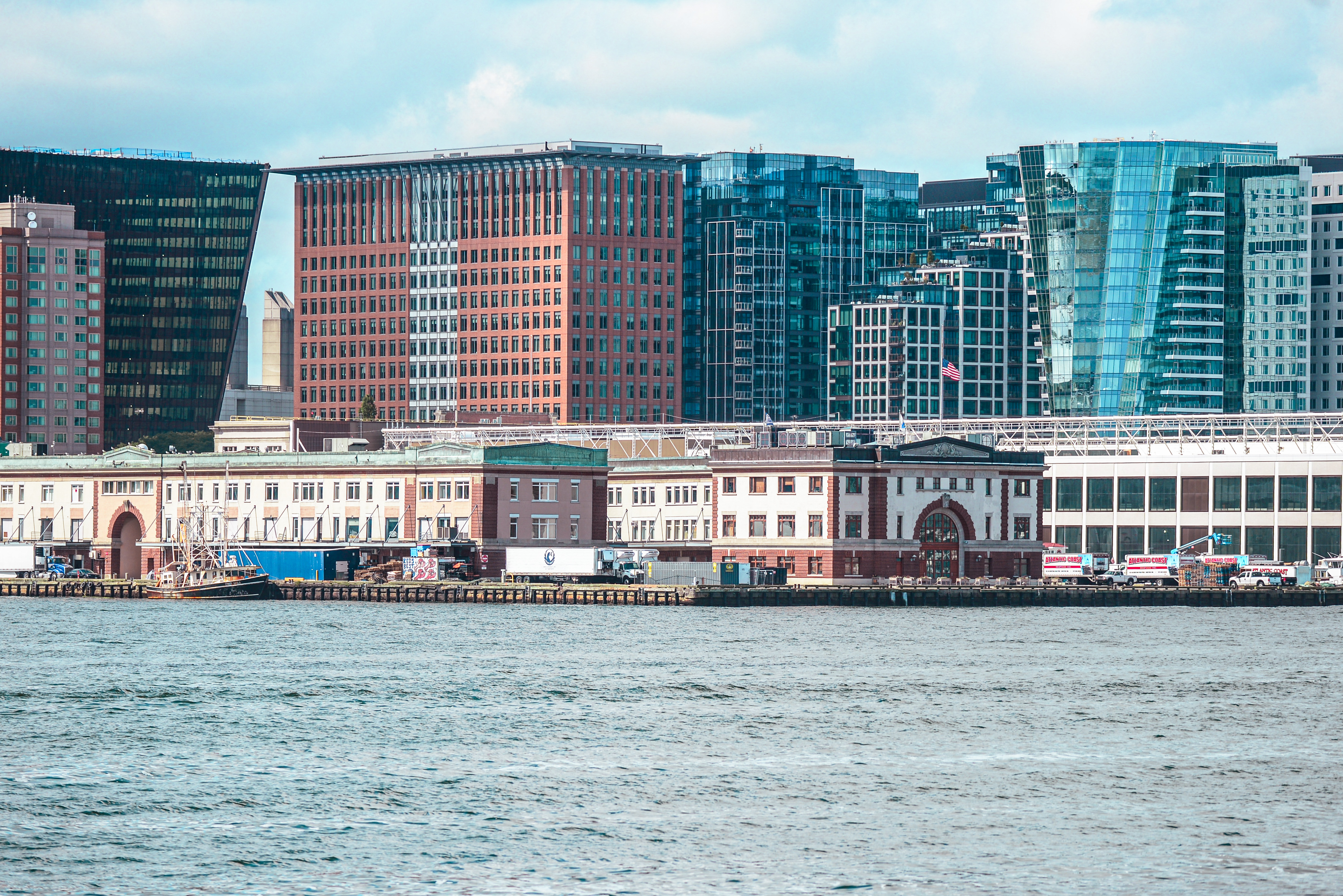
The Fish Pier from Boston Harbor

Boston Fish Pier is located on the south side of the main channel of Boston Harbor, with Logan Airport across the channel to the north. It is bounded on the south by Northern Avenue, which runs east-west on the South Boston peninsula. The pier is 300 feet (91 m) wide and 1,200 feet (370 m) long. Two virtually identical long buildings extend for much of its length, with a small administration building at the very end. They are built out of steel and concrete, and are trimmed in terra cotta. The two main buildings feature high arched hallways and 44 storefronts for the dealers, handlers, and other businesses engaged in fishery-related activities.

== History ==
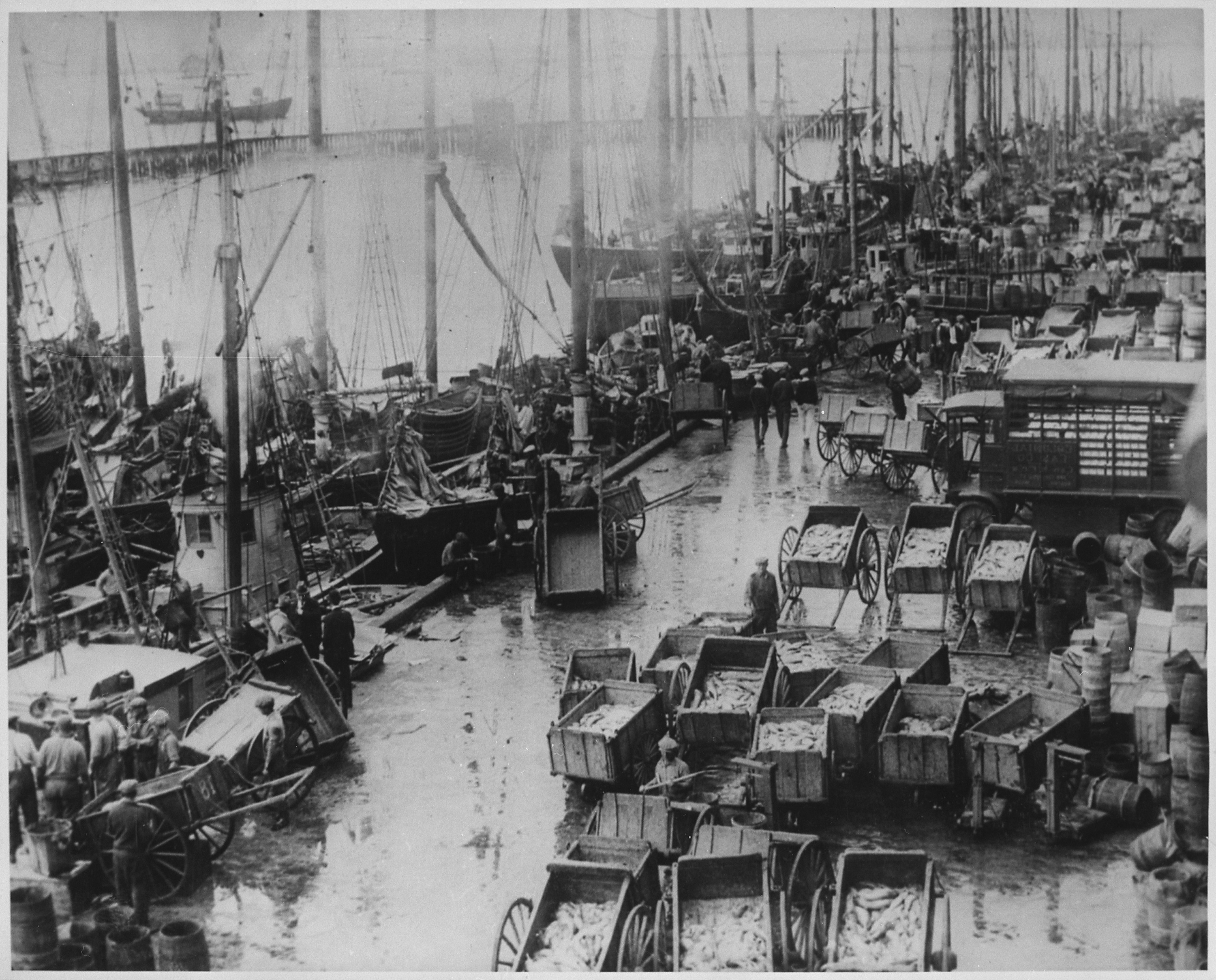
The Fish Pier crowded with fish carts, fishing boats, and workmen, ca. 1950

Prior to construction of this facility, Boston's fishing industry was based at facilities leased on T Wharf, an appendage to Long Wharf that was a central feature of the city's working waterfront for decades. Overall management of the industry was overseen by the Boston Fish Market Association. With its lease expiring in 1909, an agreement was made between the association, city, and state for the construction of a dedicated pier on the South Boston waterfront. Initially dubbed Pier Six, it was built 1910, with the buildings following in 1912. The buildings were designed by Henry F. Keyes, who also designed the adjacent Commonwealth Pier which had been considered as a site for the fish market. At the time of its completion, its facilities included an eight-story cold storage facility with a capacity of 15 million pounds of fish, which was claimed to be the largest in the world.

In 1926, the pier handled 250 million pounds of fish, provided berth space for 40 vessels, and unloading dock space for 80. The pier's business peaked in 1969, when 339 million pounds of fish were landed. The facility was taken over by the Massachusetts Port Authority in 1972, which oversaw a major rehabilitation and upgrade of its facilities in 1979. The exchange building at the end of the pier, where fish auctions were historically held, is now a conference center, but the pier is still dominated by fishery activities.

== See also ==
- National Register of Historic Places listings in northern Boston, Massachusetts
