= Track 61 (Boston) =

Industrial rail terminal track in South Boston, Massachusetts

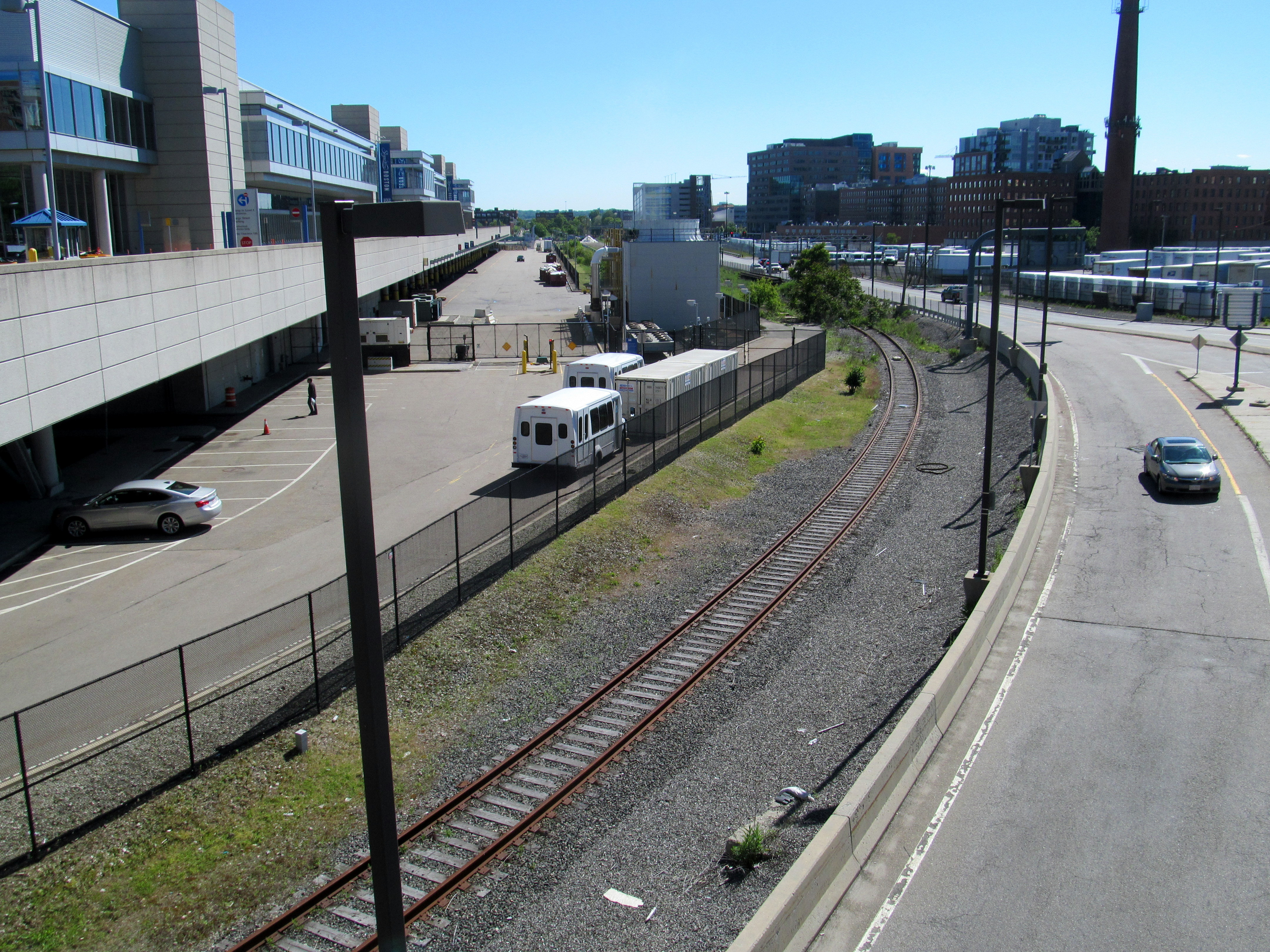
Track 61 next to the BCEC in June 2017

Track 61 is an industrial rail terminal track in South Boston, Massachusetts, also known as the Boston Terminal Running Track. Track 61 is the last remnant of the vast rail yards that once covered much of the South Boston waterfront. Track 61 legally begins at Summer Street, while the line from Bay Junction to Summer Street is the Boston Terminal Running Track and Terminal Yard. However, the names are frequently used interchangeably.

Part of what is now Track 61 was constructed in 1855 and became part of the New York and New England Railroad. Other sections were constructed from 1880 to 1920 as South Boston became a freight center. During the second half of the 20th century use of the line declined, and part of it is currently out of service. While trains do not currently operate along the line, the section from Cypher Street to the Cruise Terminal was rebuilt in conjunction with the Boston Convention & Exhibition Center construction, the line being used heavily to transport material to the Convention Center construction site. Revival of freight service and passenger services using the track was proposed by the state in the 2010s, but not funded. Since 2021, a section of the track has been used for acceptance testing of new Red Line subway cars.

== Passenger service ==
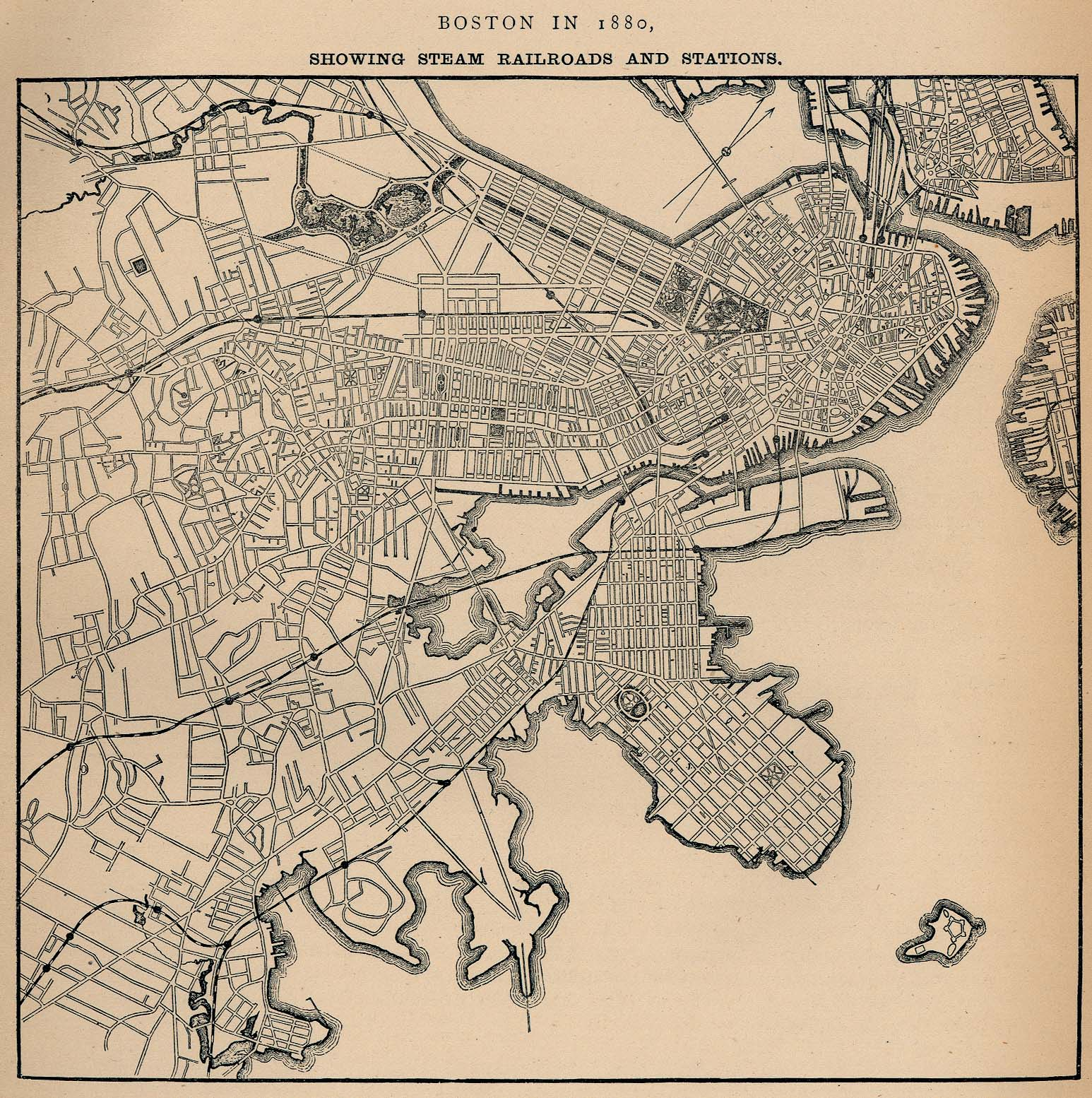
1880 map of railroads in Boston, showing the NY&NE line entering through South Boston, with stops at South Boston and Summer Street. The first freight spurs to Fan Pier are also shown.

The Boston and New York Central Railroad opened its Dorchester Branch from Dedham to Boston on January 1, 1855, begun in 1850 by the Midland Railroad as an extension of the existing Norfolk County Railroad. The terminal station was located on Summer Street near the modern location of South Station. Trains crossed the Old Colony Railroad at South Bay Junction, then ran parallel to A Street before crossing the Fort Point Channel at Summer Street. Past West 1st Street, the line ran on a trestle through shallow water. An intermediate station was located in South Boston at West 2nd Street; this was separate from the Old Colony's South Boston station at West 4th Street. After several monetary failures and a year-long injunction due to grade crossings, the line was reorganized several times, ending as the Boston, Hartford and Erie Railroad in 1863 and finally part of the New York & New England Railroad in 1873.

A spur was built in the 1870s to the new Fan Pier, constructed by erecting a seawall to hold in fill. In November 1880, a second track opened from Boston to Walpole. The tracks through South Boston were depressed for grade separation; in some places, they were as far as 5 feet below mean sea level to allow for the construction of 12 bridges overhead.

On August 22, 1896, New England Railroad (NY&NE reorganization in 1895) trains were rerouted to the Old Colony terminal downtown so that South Union Station could be built on the former NY&NE depot site. The Fort Point Channel bridge was removed, and the tracks from South Bay Junction through South Boston became freight-only. As freight service to the South Boston Waterfront increased, two more tracks were added to the depressed corridor.

== Freight service ==
The grade crossing of Congress Street, which served the tracks to Fan Pier was eliminated in 1899 by the construction of the Summer Street viaduct. A new rail yard north of Summer Street was built in 1913–14 to serve the expanded Commonwealth Pier, with a new viaduct from Summer Street to the pier over the yard.

In 1920, the War Department bought much of the Commonwealth Flats to construct the South Boston Army Base and South Boston Naval Annex. Tracks were extended through the Waterfront district to the new bases, with the Army Yard located at Summer and D Streets. The West First Street Yard was constructed to serve the variety of industries in the area. A spur was built down East 1st Street to additional Army facilities and the Boston Elevated Railway's South Boston Power Plant, overlapping the eastbound streetcar track on the street. On March 5, 1942, BERy abandoned the streetcar tracks by request of the War Department, to avoid possible collisions between streetcars and freight trains carrying petroleum and ammunition.

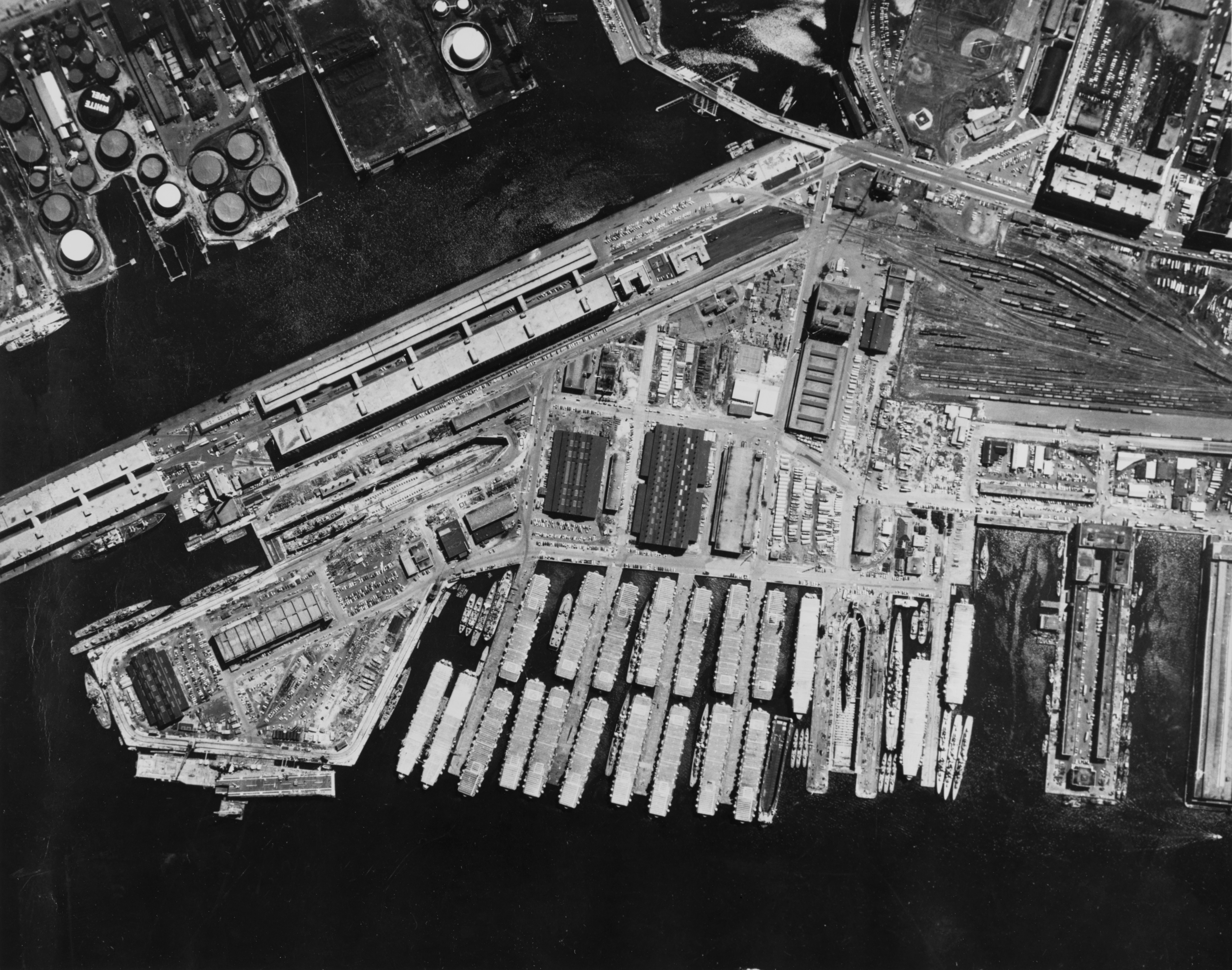
Army Yard (left) and the Boston Naval Annex in 1958

After World War II ended, rail traffic to the military bases declined until their closure in 1974. The New Haven Railroad folded into Penn Central in 1969; its freight operations were then transferred to Conrail and then to CSX Transportation. Two tracks remained on the Boston Terminal Running Track for a once-daily local freight until the 1980s. The East First Street spur closed as truck traffic to Conley Terminal increased. By 1990, reaching the Boston Terminal Running Track required a reverse move at Bay Junction, limiting the train length to just several cars.

The line was used to haul material and equipment for the Central Artery/Tunnel project (Big Dig) and Boston Convention & Exposition Center Construction, but traffic declined as the project wound down. The construction of the South Boston Haul Road reduced the Running Track to a single track and the Terminal Yard (West First Street Yard) to two tracks; much of the former Army Yard was used for the approach to the Ted Williams Tunnel.

In 1997, the Surface Transportation Board permitted CSX to abandon Track 61 past Summer Street for about three years for the construction of the South Boston Interchange (I-90 exit 25). This abandonment was later extended to 2003, and then until 2005. In 2006, CSX evicted Boston Railway Terminal Corporation, which had handled much of the Big Dig traffic but then primarily served cars for the remains of the East First Street track, from use of the line. The main section of the line had been rebuilt from Pumphouse Road to the Summer Street underpass as part of the South Boston Interchange project, including a new viaduct carrying D Street over the tracks. However, after BRT's eviction, CSX declined to pursue further freight service on the line.

== Proposals for service ==
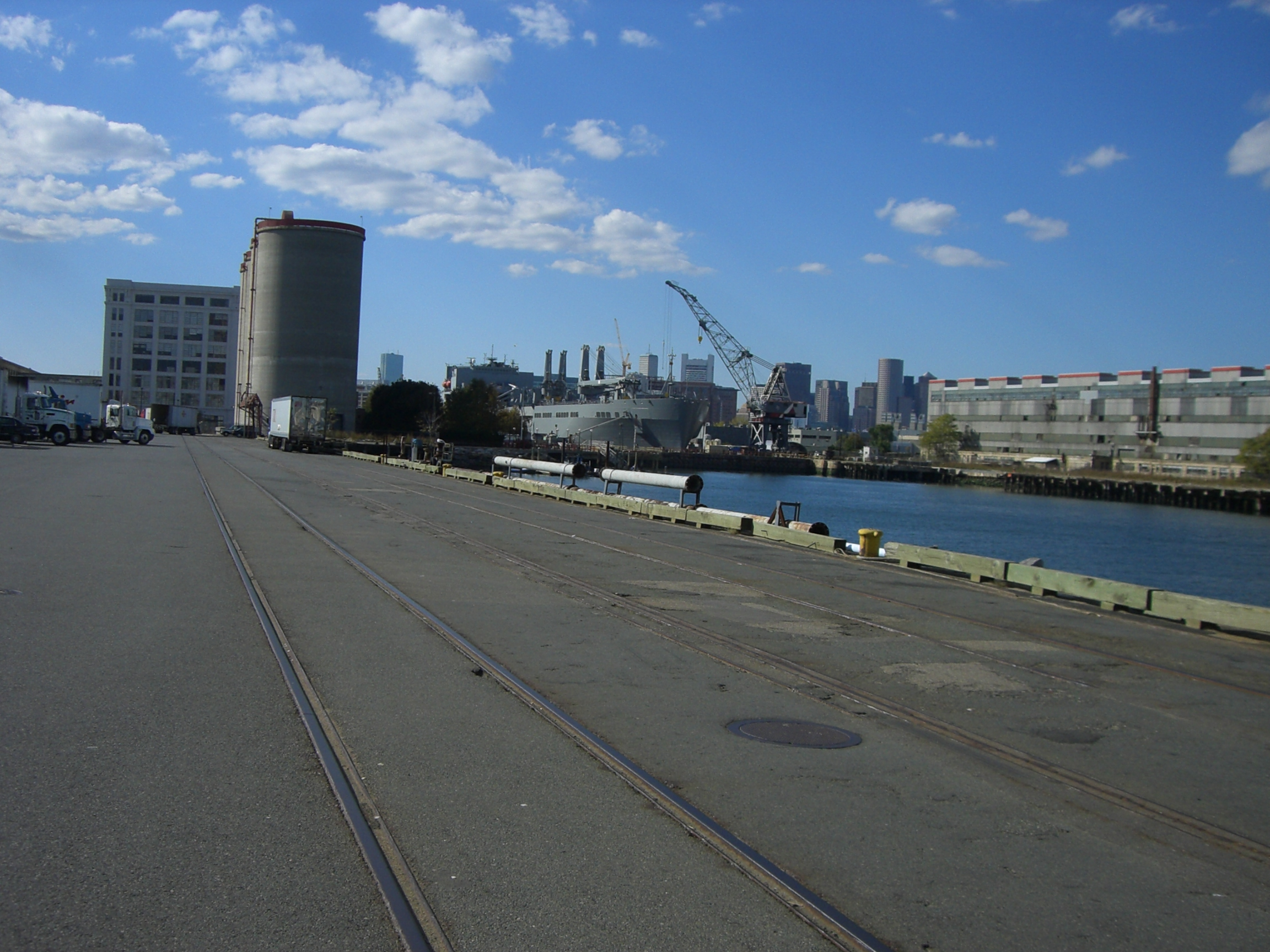
Out-of-service tracks on the International Cargo Port pier in 2006

=== Proposed return of freight service ===
Although CSX no longer was interested, the state has plans to restore the remainder of the line for freight service. This would include rehabilitation of the Running Track and Terminal Yard from Bay Junction to Summer Street, as well as restoring the end of the line through the Boston Marine Industrial Park. Possibilities initially raised in mid-2009 included service to Conley Terminal or the Massport Marine Terminal via new spurs from Track 61. The City of Boston applied for $84M in TIGER funds in 2009, including $14M for expansion of Track 61. The existing out-of-service track paralleling Dry Dock Avenue through Black Falcon Cruise Terminal and the International Cargo Port Boston (totalling 2,860 linear feet) would have been rehabilitated, and 5,910 linear feet of new track constructed along Tide Street and Fid Kennedy Avenue into the Massport Marine Terminal. The application was unsuccessful.

On October 2, 2008, the state government announced an agreement with CSX Transportation for the purchase and upgrade of several of CSX's freight lines in the state. CSX agreed to sell its lines from Taunton to Fall River and New Bedford for use by the South Coast Rail project, as well as the Grand Junction Branch, the Framingham-to-Worcester section of the Worcester Line, and Track 61. Other parts of the agreement included plans for double-stack freights west of Worcester and the abandonment of Beacon Park Yard. The agreement was signed on September 23, 2009. The first closing (including the Boston Terminal Running Track) was originally scheduled for May 2010 and eventually was finalized on June 11, 2010.

In May 2013, Massport released plans to build a dedicated haul road to Conley Terminal. This indicates a lack of interest in extending rail service to Conley, which would require a new bridge over Reserved Channel rather than using the existing Summer Street bridge. The Conley Haul Road would not affect expanded Track 61 service to the Waterfront area, which is still considered a "competitive advantage" by MassDOT.

=== Proposed passenger service ===
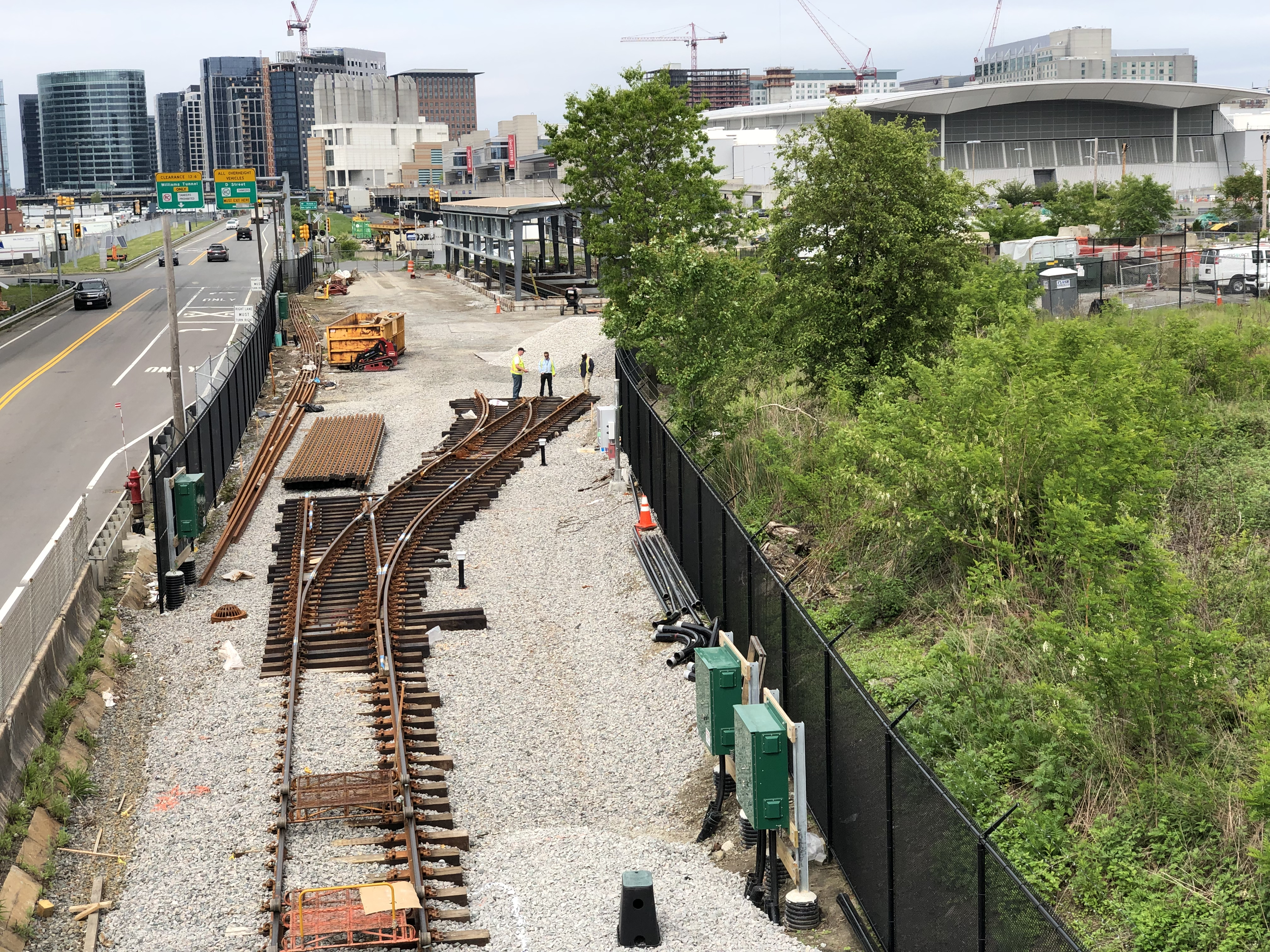
Red Line test track under construction near BCEC, May 2019

In 2013, a Boston Globe columnist reported on a plan by MassDOT and the MBTA to provide rail service between the Boston Convention and Exhibition Center (BCEC) and Back Bay station, to meet demand for those attending conventions at BCEC and staying in Back Bay hotels. The service would access Track 61 from the existing loop tracks at Widett Circle, with a new crossing of the Old Colony Lines at Bay Junction. The service would share with the Fairmount Line a fleet of new diesel multiple units, which the state then planned to acquire by 2018. In 2014, it was revealed by the state that the line would be part of the proposed Indigo Line.

Operating passenger service on this routing would require crossing the Northeast Corridor and Old Colony Lines tracks at grade, with potential detriment to existing Amtrak and commuter rail operations. These conflicts were previously noted with proposals for Readville-Allston and Riverside-JFK/UMass DMU services in 2004, resulting in such projects being given low ratings in the Program for Mass Transportation.

Plans for DMU service were cancelled in 2015 due to funding cuts by Massachusetts Governor Charlie Baker that stopped the purchase of DMUs that were to be used for short train service on Track 61 and the Fairmount Line. In December 2016, city officials proposed routing some Fairmount Line trains over Track 61 to the BCEC as part of high-frequency Indigo Line service. However, the proposal did not provide a funding source nor solutions to operational issues. The plan was also criticized as not serving a demonstrated transportation need, since it would bypass South Station and thus connect neither Dorchester nor the Seaport to downtown or the subway network.

In April-May 2017, the MBTA dismantled the old BCEC construction sidings. In June 2017, Representative Nick Collins expressed a hope that a public/private partnership would enable passenger rail service to be extended out as far as the Raymond L. Flynn Marine Park.

=== MBTA test track ===
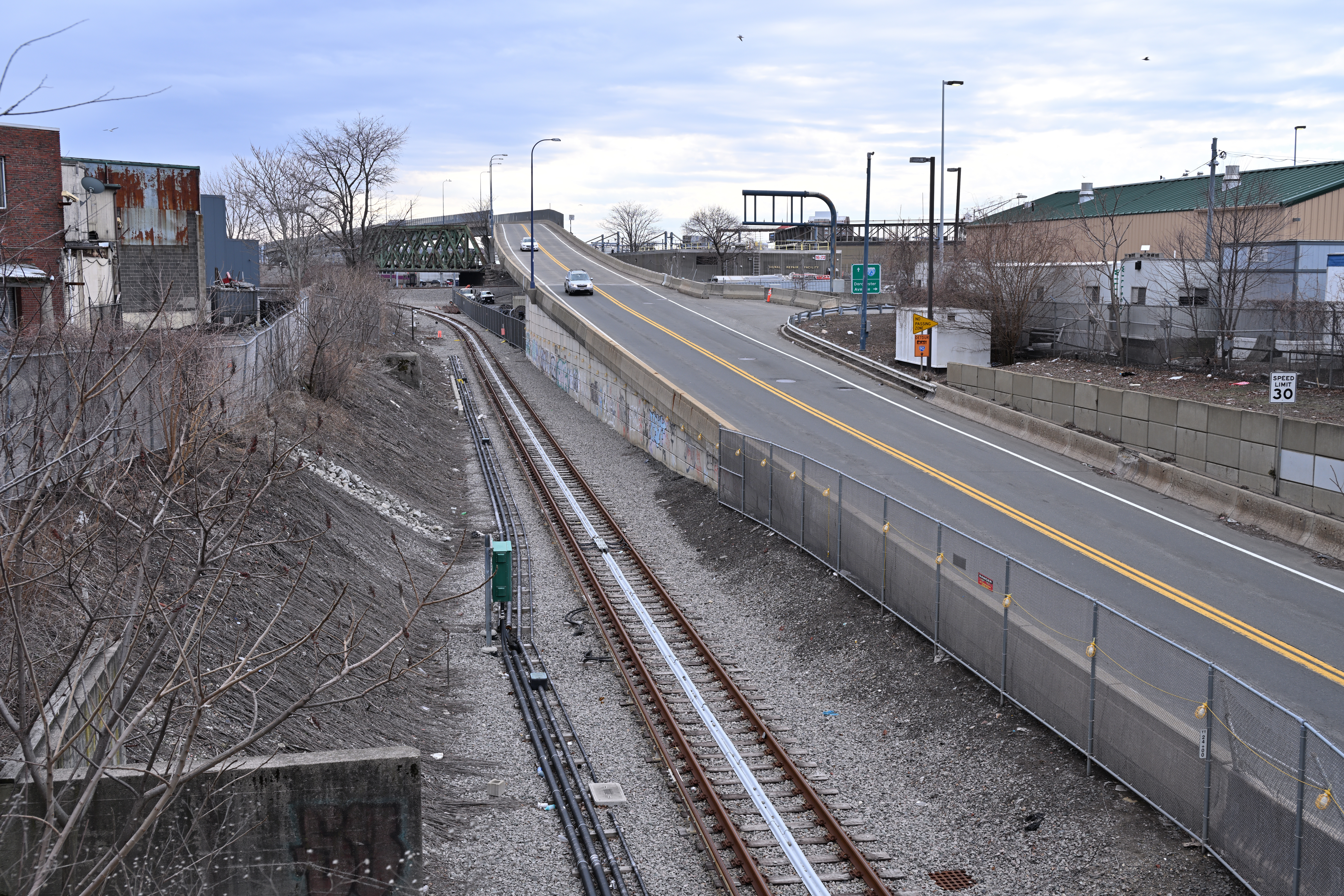
The Red Line test track

In May 2017, the MBTA announced that $32 million would be spent to convert part of Track 61 into a test track with third rail, beginning that fall. The track will be used for acceptance testing of new Red Line subway cars until 2023. Two property owners sued the state in 2018 to halt the tests, claiming that railroad easements on their property do not cover subway use. The case went to court in January 2020. The test track was 88% complete by December 2019, and ready for testing in February 2020. It reached substantial completion on March 12, 2021, and was fully completed that December. MassDOT lost the court case in May 2023 and will be required to compensate the property owner.
