= Boston Harbor Islands Partnership =

The Boston Harbor Islands Partnership is a non-profit partnership organization based in Boston, whose purpose is "to coordinate the activities of the Federal, State, and local authorities and the private sector in the development and implementation of a general management plan" for the Boston Harbor Islands National Recreation Area. The Partnership was established by the United States Congress in 1996, as part of the law which designated the Boston Harbor Islands as a unit of the national parks system.

== Member organizations ==
- National Park Service (NPS) – Federal agency which provides a staff of park rangers who offer educational and interpretive services to visitors on Georges Island (for example, they lead tours of Fort Warren). NPS also provides a staff of rangers for the Downtown "Gateway Area" to the park, which includes the Boston Harbor Islands Pavilion and an additional booth on Long Wharf. NPS is not a land-owning member of the Partnership.
- Massachusetts Department of Conservation and Recreation (DCR) – State agency which provides a staff of park rangers at visitors' centers on both Georges Island and Spectacle Island. DCR rangers provide visitors with the same educational and interpretive services as NPS rangers. DCR is the primary land-owning member of the Partnership.
- United States Coast Guard (USCG) – Federal agency which owns and maintains the three lighthouses in the park area. Boston Light is located on Little Brewster Island. It was the first lighthouse to be built in what would become the United States. It also has the distinction of being the only non-automated lighthouse remaining in the United States (USCG personnel act as light keepers).
- Massachusetts Port Authority (MASSPORT) – State agency which operates Logan International Airport, as well as a variety of maritime industrial facilities (e.g., the Conley Container Terminal in South Boston, the Black Falcon Cruise Terminal, and the North Jetty).
- Massachusetts Water Resources Authority (MWRA) – State agency which owns and operates the Deer Island Waste Water Treatment Plant and the Nut Island Headworks. These facilities provide wastewater treatment for 43 communities, and have eliminated the discharge of sewage into the harbor.
- City of Boston – The City is a land-owning member of the Partnership; it owns Long Island, Moon Island, Rainsford Island and part of Spectacle Island. It also provides funding for environmental remediation projects on the various islands, for example the cleanup of asbestos contamination from Gallops Island (the island is therefore closed to the public until further notice).
- Boston Redevelopment Authority (BRA) – The City of Boston's planning, economic, and industrial development agency. BRA initiated the development of the HarborWalk program which, when complete, will provide a 43-mile pedestrian walkway along the waterfront of Boston and its neighboring communities. BRA also owns and operates both Long Wharf (which is the central Downtown terminal for water transportation on Boston Harbor), and the Boston Marine Industrial Park (which is a 152-acre maritime facility located in the Seaport District).
- Thompson Island Outward Bound Education Center (TIOBEC) – Non-profit organization which owns and manages Thompson Island. It also operates the island's educational institutions, which offer summer and year-round programs for the Boston Public Schools, as well as an Outward Bound program. The island is only open to the public on Saturdays during the summer, through tours which are led by the Volunteers and Friends of the Boston Harbor Islands.
- The Trustees of Reservations (The Trustees) – Non-profit organization which owns and operates 89 reservations (totaling nearly 22,000 acres) throughout the state of Massachusetts. A land-owning member of the Partnership, The Trustees manage Worlds End for public recreational uses. Worlds Ends is located on a mainland peninsula and can be reached on foot, bicycle, or by car. The reservation charges an entrance fee, and is open every day of the year.
- Boston Harbor Island Alliance – Established in 1996 solely to provide financial support to the Boston Harbor Islands National Recreation Area. The Island Alliance works to attract capital investment from the private sector, and coordinates outside activities to secure financial support for the park system. The Island Alliance directly supports park facilities on the mainland (e.g. construction of the "Gateway" to the park system: the Boston Harbor Islands Pavilion), as well as the renovation of existing facilities (e.g. the Visitors' Centers located on Spectacle Island and Georges Island). The Island Alliance also provides financial management services for the other members of the Partnership
- Boston Harbor Islands Advisory Council – The Council advises the Partnership in the planning and operation of the park through public involvement. It helps to facilitate the public process in connection with the general management plan for the Boston Harbor Islands park system. It has two seats on the Partnership, and consists of 28 members (appointed by the NPS director) which represent seven distinct interest groups:
  - municipalities
  - educational and cultural institutions
  - environmental organizations
  - business and commercial entities
  - Boston Harbor advocacy organizations
  - Native American interests
  - community groups

== Affiliated organizations ==
Members of the Boston Harbor Islands Partnership often work closely with other Harbor-affiliated organizations (both non-profits and for-profits) that are not themselves members of the Partnership.

- Eastern National (EN) - 501(c)(3) non-profit "cooperating agency" which operates bookstores at over 150 National Parks and related public trusts. It is a philanthropic organization, distributing its revenues both directly and indirectly in the form of grants that support the educational and interpretive programs offered by its partners.

The Island Alliance, the Department of Conservation and Recreation, and the National Park Service made a joint decision to select Eastern National to manage the park bookstore located in the Visitors' Center on Georges Island as well as the retail location at the Boston Harbor Islands Pavilion.

- Boston's Best Cruises (BBC) - For-profit company that provides ferry services from Long Wharf to Spectacle Island and Georges Island.
- Jasper White's Summer Shack Restaurant - operates food service concessions on both Spectacle Island and Georges Island.
