= South Boston Army Base =

Coordinates: 42°20′48.99″N 71°1′54.58″W

- South Boston, Massachusetts
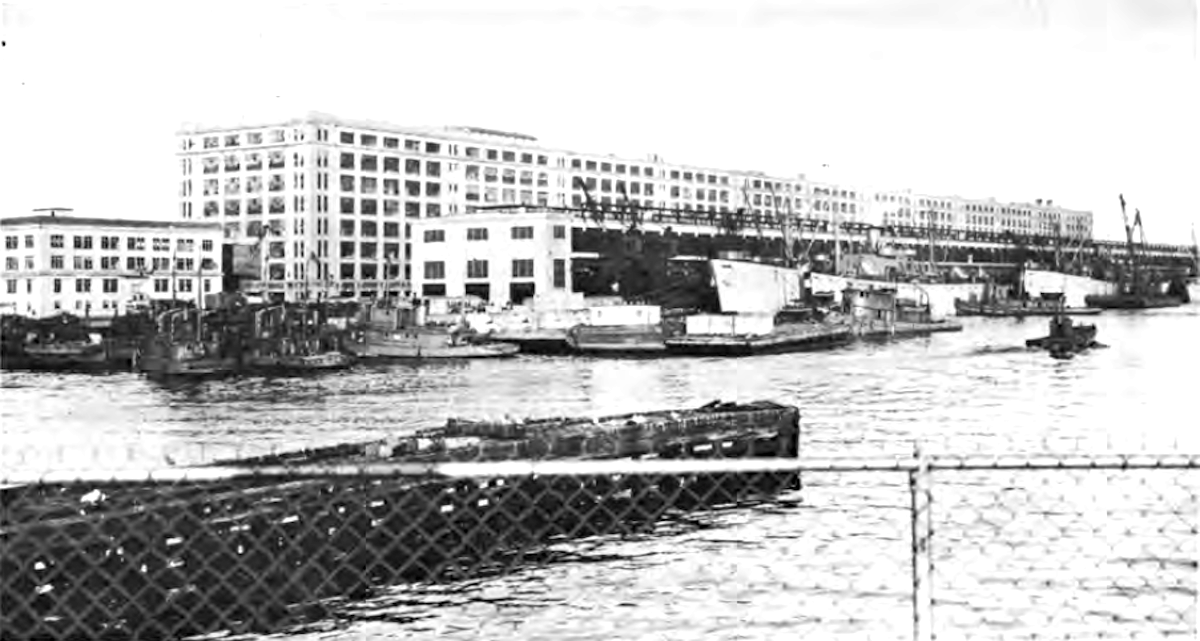
- Boston Army Base, reactivated World War I installation, Boston Port of Embarkation.

Site information
- Type: Army port of embarkation
- Controlled by: United States Army

Site history
- Built: 1918
- In use: 1918 — 1974

The South Boston Army Base, previously the Boston Quartermaster Terminal or Army Supply Base and in 1937 named the Boston Army Base, was a 58-acre United States Army annex located in South Boston. It was authorized in April 1918 and opened for operation in October 1918. The terminal was part of the Boston sub-port of the New York Port of Embarkation during World War I. During World War II, it was a component of the Boston Port of Embarkation. It ceased operation in 1974.

== History ==
The Army Supply Base, also known as the Boston Quartermaster Terminal, was authorized 5 April 1918 to include piers, warehouses, rail yard and open storage at the foot of Summner Street fronting on the reserved channel and Dry Dock Avenue in South Boston. The installation was placed into operation 25 October 1918. During World War I the Army port facilities in Boston, including the terminal, were a sub-port of the New York Port of Embarkation. The facility was renamed Boston Army Base in 1937.

The Department of War purchased a large part of the Commonwealth Flats in 1920, and split up the land between the South Boston Naval Annex and the Boston Quartermaster Terminal. Rail service to the base was provided by Track 61.

In 1939, the USMS North Star departed from the South Boston Army Base as part of the 1939-1941 United States Antarctic Service Expedition. The expedition was commanded by Rear Admiral Richard E. Byrd who used North Star as his flagship. On board the North Star when she departed was the unique Antarctic Snow Cruiser which completed a 1,000 mile journey from Chicago to Boston under its own power.

=== World War II ===
During World War II, the base was used to warehouse and distribute military goods and supplies and coordinate troop shipments. Troops staged at Camp Myles Standish in Taunton. After the war, activity declined and many buildings and structures on the base fell into disrepair.

From 1942 until 1970 the South Boston Army Base was primarily used as a terminal for military ships transporting personnel and equipment to destinations in Europe.

From 1965 until 1982, the South Boston Army Base was the location of the Armed Forces Entrance and Examination Station (AFEES) serving eastern Massachusetts and Rhode Island. It was the site of anti-draft protests during the Vietnam War.

=== Closure ===
In 1974, the base was closed, and became part of the Boston Marine Industrial Park after the City of Boston purchased the land in the 1980s.

== Present day ==
Today, the former base is home to the various companies which have moved in over the years. Sail Boston has also used the land to host ships when they are in port as well, including former base land at the Black Falcon Cruise Terminal.

== See also ==
- New York Port of Embarkation
- Port of Boston
- List of military installations in Massachusetts
