= South Boston Naval Annex =

Shipyard annex in Boston, Massachusetts

Coordinates: 42°20′48.99″N 71°1′54.58″W

- South Boston, Massachusetts
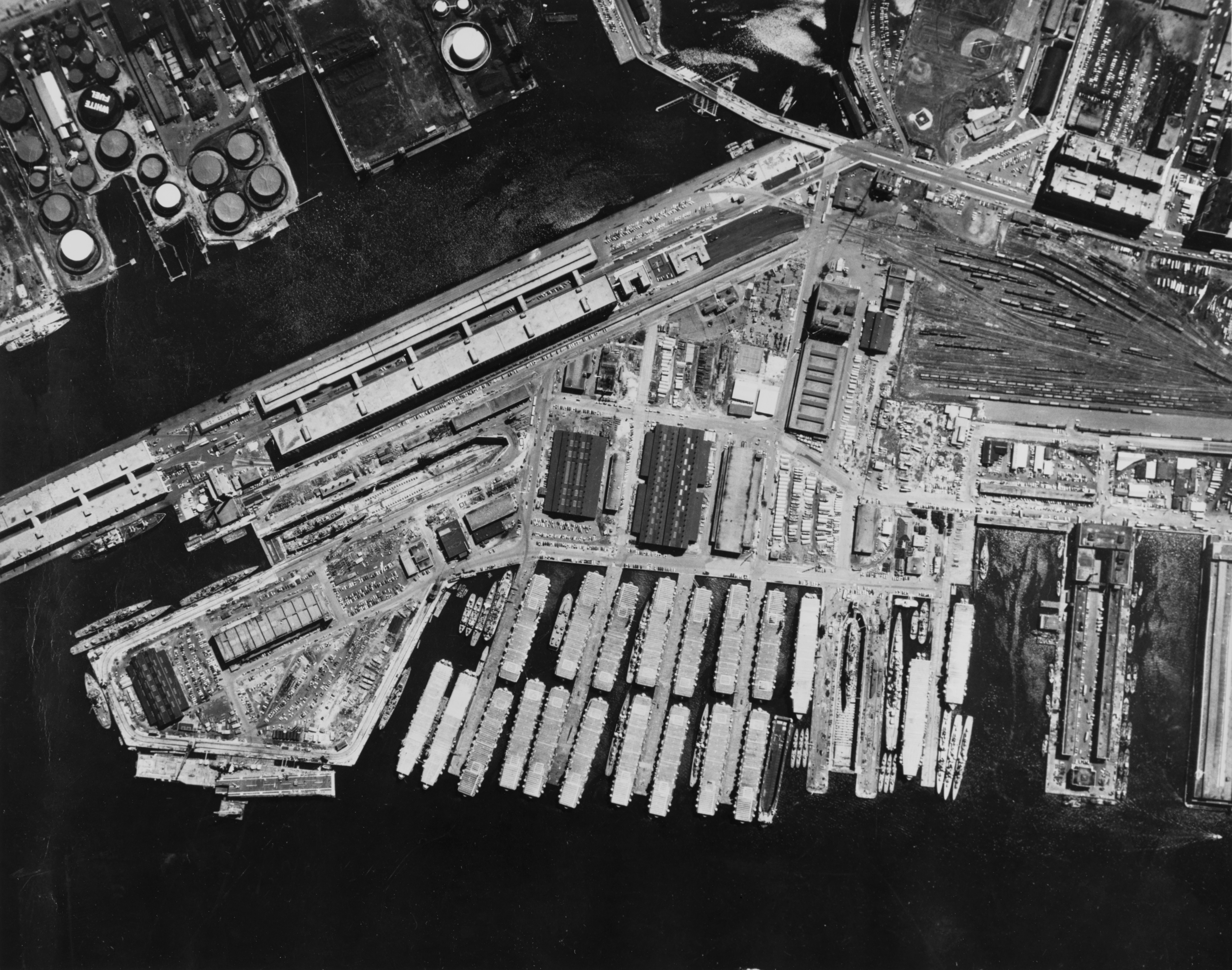
- The Annex, circa 1958. In this image, South is on top.

Site information
- Type: Shipyard annex
- Controlled by: United States Navy

Site history
- Built: 1920
- In use: 1920–1974

The South Boston Naval Annex was a 167-acre (68 ha) United States Navy shipyard annex located in South Boston. An annex of Boston Navy Yard in Charlestown, it was operational from 1920 to 1974, when it was closed along with the main shipyard. The annex is also home to Dry Dock Number 3, one of the largest dry docks on the East Coast. Most of the former annex site was listed on the National Register of Historic Places in 2022.

== History ==
=== Opening ===
The Department of Defense purchased a large part of the Commonwealth Flats in 1920, and split up the land between the Naval Annex and the South Boston Army Base. At this time, the Navy began construction of buildings, which would continue up until World War II. Rail service to the annex was provided by Track 61.

=== World War II ===
At the South Boston Annex, work was started in March 1940 on a quay wall and wharf and on a machine shop 1,300 feet (400 m) long and 500 feet (150 m) wide. The following spring a new power plant project was undertaken, to provide six boilers, a compressor and a primary connection to the Edison system. An additional waterfront project, comprising two 980-foot (300 m) timber piers and a steel sheet pile bulkhead, was started in the summer of 1941, followed in September by construction of an additional shop 420 feet (130 m) long and 120 feet (37 m) wide.

In December 1941, work was started on a graving dock, 693 feet (211 m) long, 91 feet (28 m) wide at the entrance, and 32 feet (9.8 m) deep over the blocks, for the repair of cruisers. This dock, which was built inside a cellular steel pile cofferdam, was completed and placed in service in March 1943. The cofferdam was later incorporated as part of Piers 5 and 6.

Work was also undertaken in 1941 on a 500-man barracks for ship's crews, necessitated by the fact that with three-shift repair work, the crews could not be quartered aboard.

The expansion of the Annex continued with the construction of an additional 900-foot (270 m) pier, started in the fall of 1942, a rigger's shop, a paint shop, and a general shop, started in November of that year, and extensive improvements and additions to utilities, streets, tracks, and equipment.

The Navy’s 1940-43 expansion of the South Boston Annex was built "in an area contiguous to the Commonwealth Dock, a 1,200-foot drydock originally built by the Commonwealth of Massachusetts and subsequently acquired by the Navy (p. 168)." This pre-existing graving-dock facility is what’s now called "Dry Dock Number 3".

=== Post-War to closure ===
After the war, the annex was used to store ships that were placed in reserve. In 1974, the Boston Navy Yard was closed, and the annex became the Boston Marine Industrial Park after the City of Boston purchased the land.

=== Atlantic Reserve Fleet, Boston ===
Atlantic Reserve Fleet, Boston also called Boston Group, Atlantic Reserve Fleet opened in 1946 as part of the United States Navy reserve fleets. Some ships in the fleet were reactivated for the Korean War and Vietnam War. Some ships were upgraded or converted for new a role in the Navy. The reserve fleet closed in September 1961. The ships in the fleet were either scrapped, used as targets or move to the James River Reserve Fleet and Beaumont Reserve Fleet.

== Present day ==
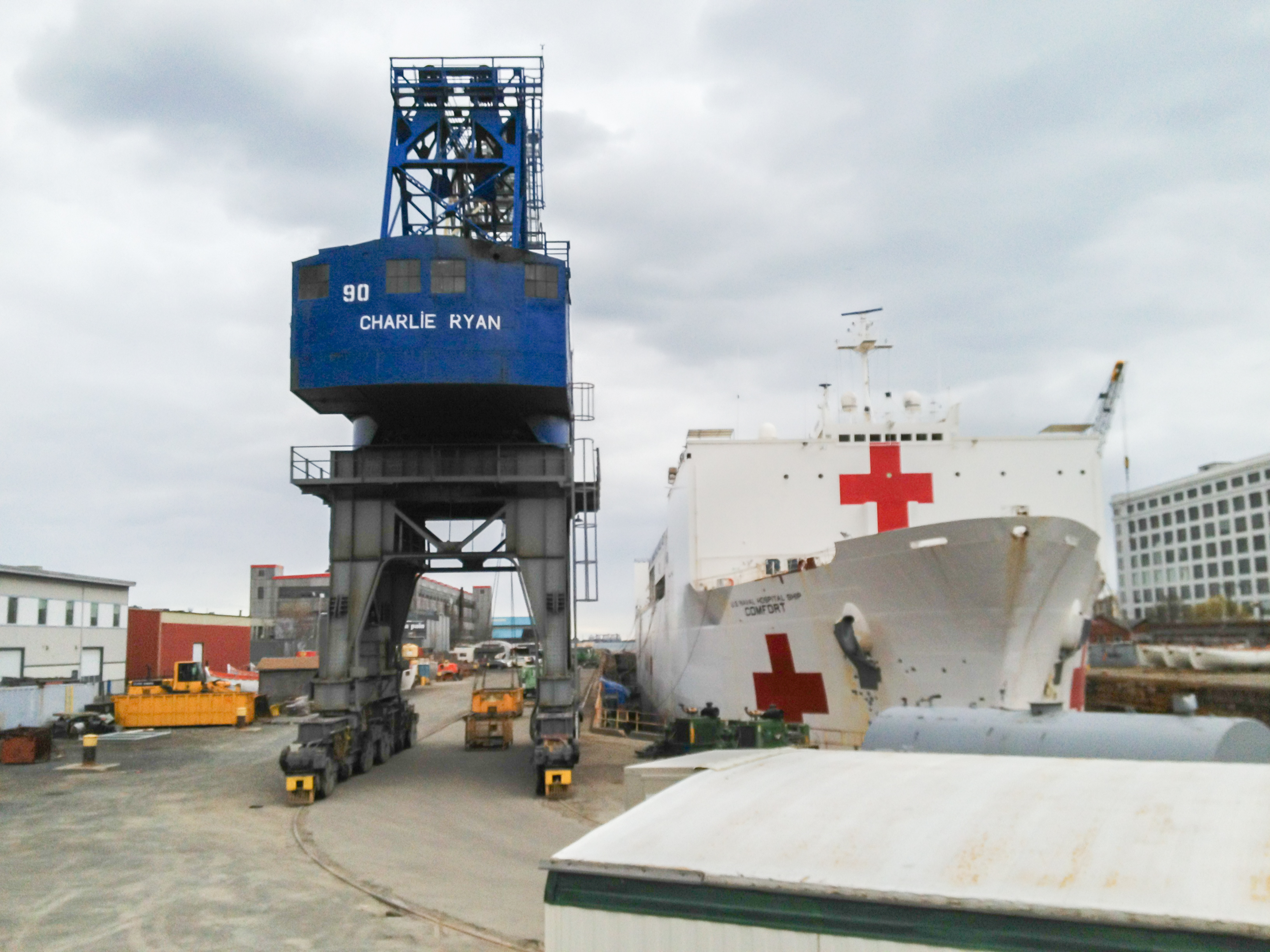
Dockside crane on wide gauge tracks at Dry Dock Number 3

Today, the former yard is home to the various companies which have moved in over the years, having been integrated into the larger South Boston Waterfront. Sail Boston has also used the land to host ships when they are in port as well, along with the South Boston Army Base's land, which now operates as the Black Falcon Cruise Terminal under ownership of the Massachusetts Port Authority. Built in 1943, a former Marine machine shop (known then as "Building 53") now houses Harpoon Brewery, an auto shop, and a seafood distributor. Three of the four original warehouse cranes are still in use today. The auto shop utilizes cranes 1 and 3, Nagle utilizes crane 2, and while crane 4 is present, it is disabled and stationary in Harpoon's warehouse due to space restrictions.

On 7 August 1992 the Cunard luxury liner Queen Elizabeth 2 grounded on an uncharted rock in Vineyard Sound, south of Nashawena and Cuttyhunk Islands. The ship was repaired at Dry Dock Number 3, the only dry dock nearby capable of accommodating the QE2. Another ship to use Dry Dock Number 3 was the former USS Massachusetts (BB-59) from November 1998 to March 1999.

Many of the buildings and cranes of the Navy Annex still stand, with their numbers being maintained. Dry Dock Number 3 is used by the Boston Ship Repair company to repair ships – mostly those of the US Navy, United States Maritime Administration and Military Sealift Command.

=== Dry docks ===
Dock No.	Material of which dock is constructed	Length	Width	Depth	Date Completed	Source
3	Granite and concrete	1,158 feet 9 inches (353.19 m)	149 feet (45 m)	44 feet 9 inches (13.64 m)	1919	
4	Reinforced concrete	687 feet 6 inches (209.55 m)	104 feet (32 m)	36 feet (11 m)	1943	

== See also ==
- Port of Boston
- South Boston Waterfront
- List of military installations in Massachusetts
