= Atlantic Wharf (disambiguation) =

Atlantic Wharf is a southern area of the city of Cardiff, Wales.

Atlantic Wharf may also refer to:

- Atlantic Wharf (building), a skyscraper in Boston, Massachusetts
- Atlantic Wharf (leisure village), an indoor entertainment complex in Cardiff, Wales
