= Russia Wharf =

Russia Wharf Atlantic Wharf
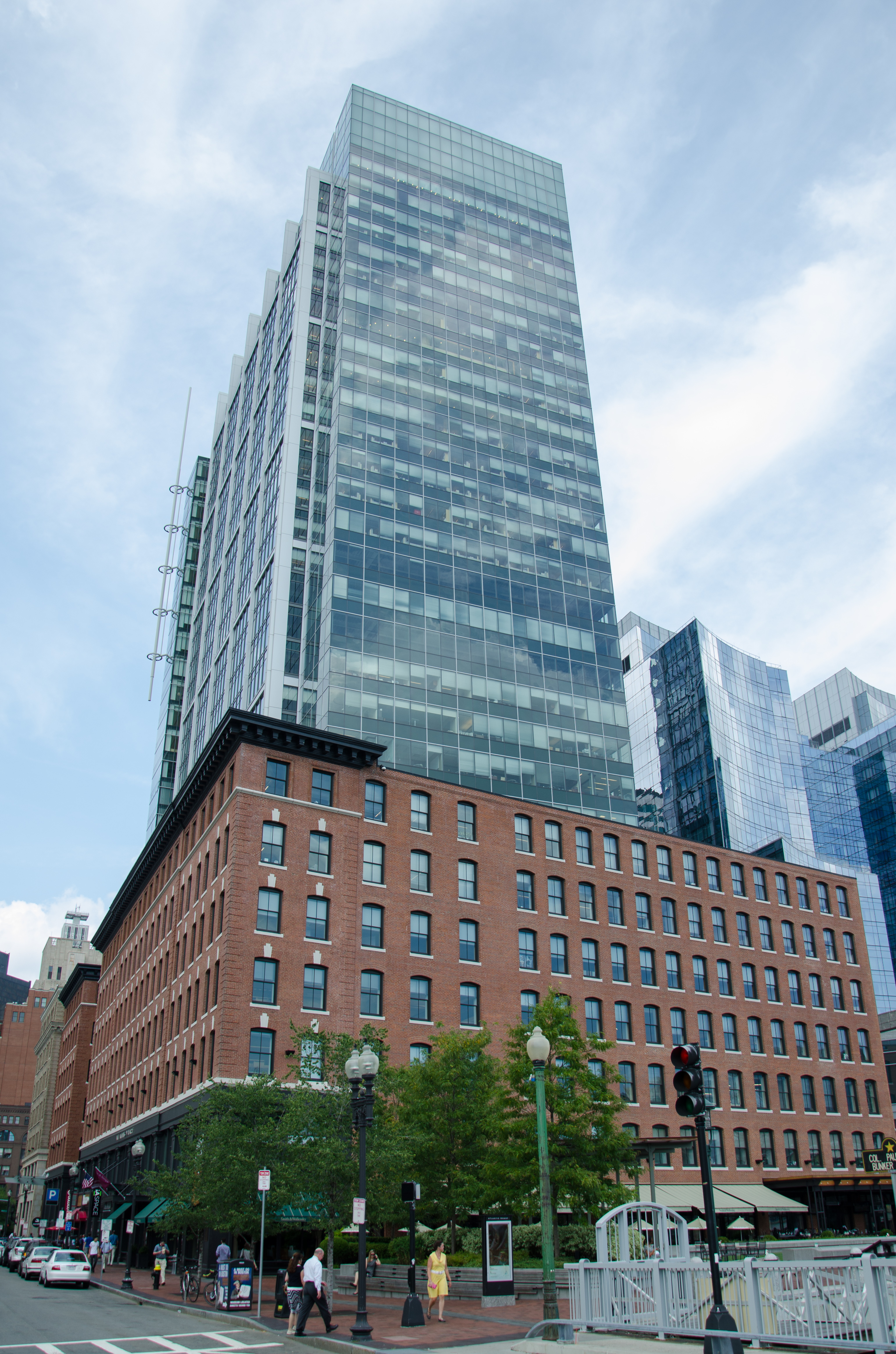
- Interactive map of the Russia Wharf; Atlantic Wharf area

General information
- Status: Completed
- Type: Office, Residential, Hotel
- Location: 503 Atlantic Avenue, Boston, Massachusetts, United States
- Coordinates: 42.353323°N 71.052854°W
- Construction started: 2006
- Completed: 2011
- Opening: 2011

Height
- Antenna spire: 436 ft (133 m)

Technical details
- Floor count: 32

Design and construction
- Architect: CBT Architects
- Developer: Boston Properties

Russia Wharf is a high-rise building in downtown Boston, Massachusetts. The building rises 436 feet (133 m) and contains 32 floors. Construction began in 2006 and was finished in early 2011. It stands as the 31st-tallest building in Boston. As of 2009, developer Boston Properties began to refer to the building as Atlantic Wharf.

== Description ==
The architectural firm that designed the building is Childs Bertman Tseckares Inc., of Boston. The civil engineer, also responsible for managing permitting (including Chapter 91 Licensing) was Vanasse Hangen Brustlin, Inc. of Watertown, Massachusetts. The mixed use project includes approximately 709,000 square feet (65,900 m^{2}) of class-A commercial office space and 65 residential units. The site consists of approximately 2.2 acres (8,900 m^{2}). From about 1897 to 2007, the site contained three low-rise mercantile buildings called the Russia, Graphic Arts, and Tufts Buildings. The office tower was constructed on the site of the Graphic Arts and Tufts Buildings.

The project was controversial because of the historic nature of the buildings and their prominent position on the edge of Fort Point Channel. The result was that the "Russia Building" fronting on Atlantic Avenue was retained in its entirety and the south and east facing historic brick facades of the Graphic Arts and Tufts Buildings were retained and restored. The interiors of these two buildings were destroyed and a new tower was built, rising 341 feet (104 m) above the old facades. The building rises 32 stories above the street and extends six stories below.

In the fall of 2009, the project created additional controversy when its developer, Boston Properties, was accused by The Boston Harbor Association of reneging on public space requirements which Boston Properties agreed to in exchange for being allowed to exceed height restrictions.

The building opened in January 2011 and boasts multiple ground floor restaurants, an art gallery, multi-media center, channel concierges and is the new home of the Boston Society of Architects' BSA Space, all available to the public. This was the first LEED Platinum high-rise in Boston.

== See also ==
- Russia Wharf Buildings, listed on the National Register of Historic Places
