= Raymond L. Flynn Marine Park =

Industrial park in Boston, Massachusetts

Coordinates: 42.34420°N 71.03791°W

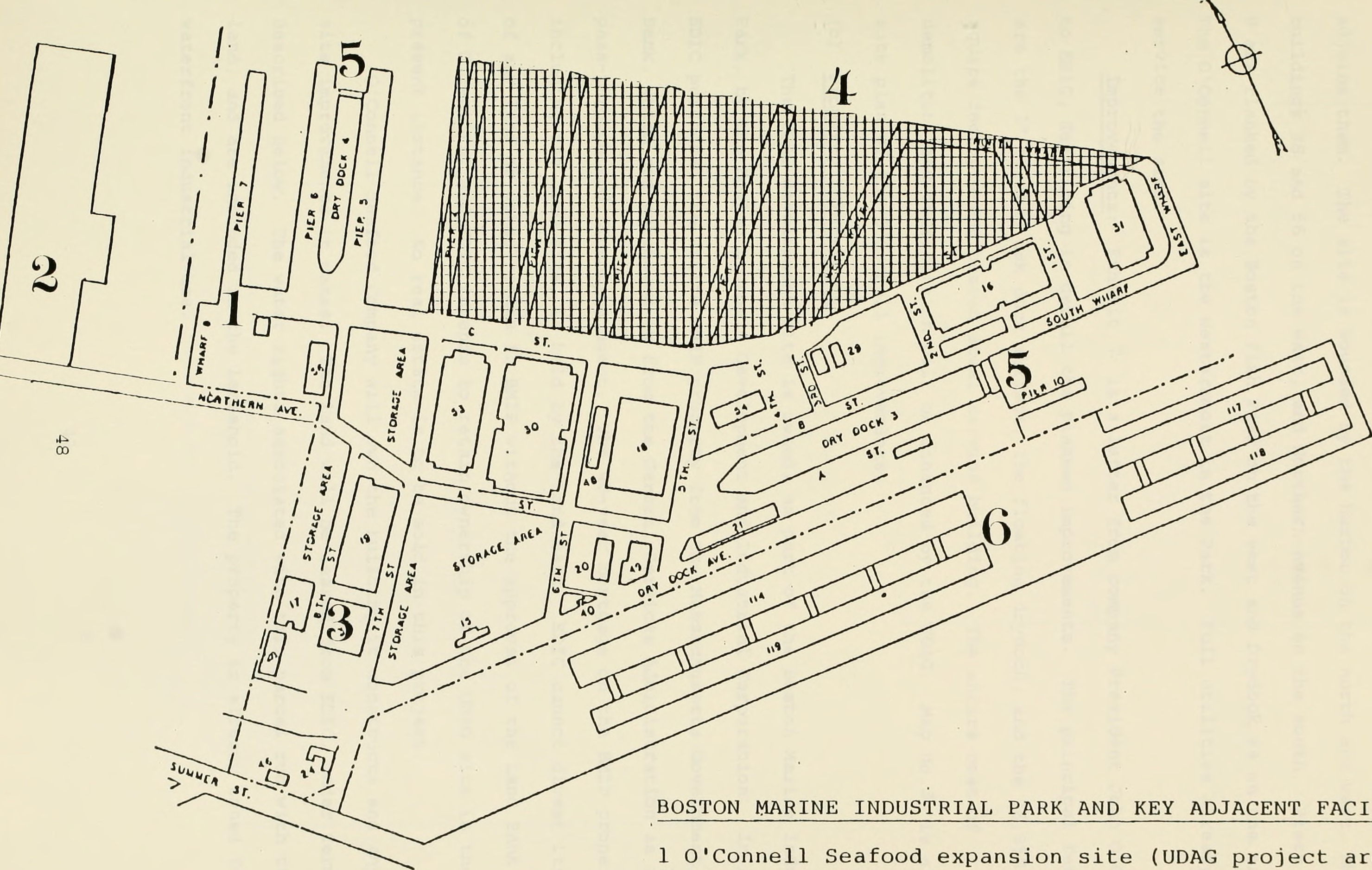
1980 map of the Boston Marine Industrial Park

Raymond L. Flynn Marine Park, formerly known as the Boston Marine Industrial Park, is an industrial park which has been created on the Commonwealth Flats in South Boston, Massachusetts, United States. Before its creation, the site was used as the location for the South Boston Naval Annex, the South Boston Army Base, and was used as a general seaport district for many years. Currently, the park is in the process of being redeveloped, and utilizes many of the former military buildings. The Black Falcon Cruise Terminal is located on the site of the former Army base.

Also located on the site is the extensive Coastal Cement Corporation facility, designed by HMFH Architects. Completed in 1989, the facility spans 14,000 square feet with four silos that reach 120 feet and collectively store 41,000 tons of cement. The project drew considerable attention for its unconventional architecture, which resulted in several awards including the 1990 New England Regional Council/AIA Honor Award for New Commercial Construction, the Washington Waterfront Center's national Excellence on the Waterfront Award, as well as the Excellence in Concrete Building Design Award from the Portland Cement Association & the Association of General Contractors.

A structure on the north side of Black Falcon Avenue, originally constructed in 1918 as an Army warehouse, is now the Innovation and Design Building, which houses the Boston Design Center.

In February 2016, the park was renamed in honor of former Boston mayor Raymond Flynn.

As of January 2025, the Massachusetts Convention Center Authority plans to extend its North Station–Fan Pier ferry service to Pier 10 in the Marine Park in June 2025.
