= Russia Wharf Buildings =

- U.S. National Register of Historic Places
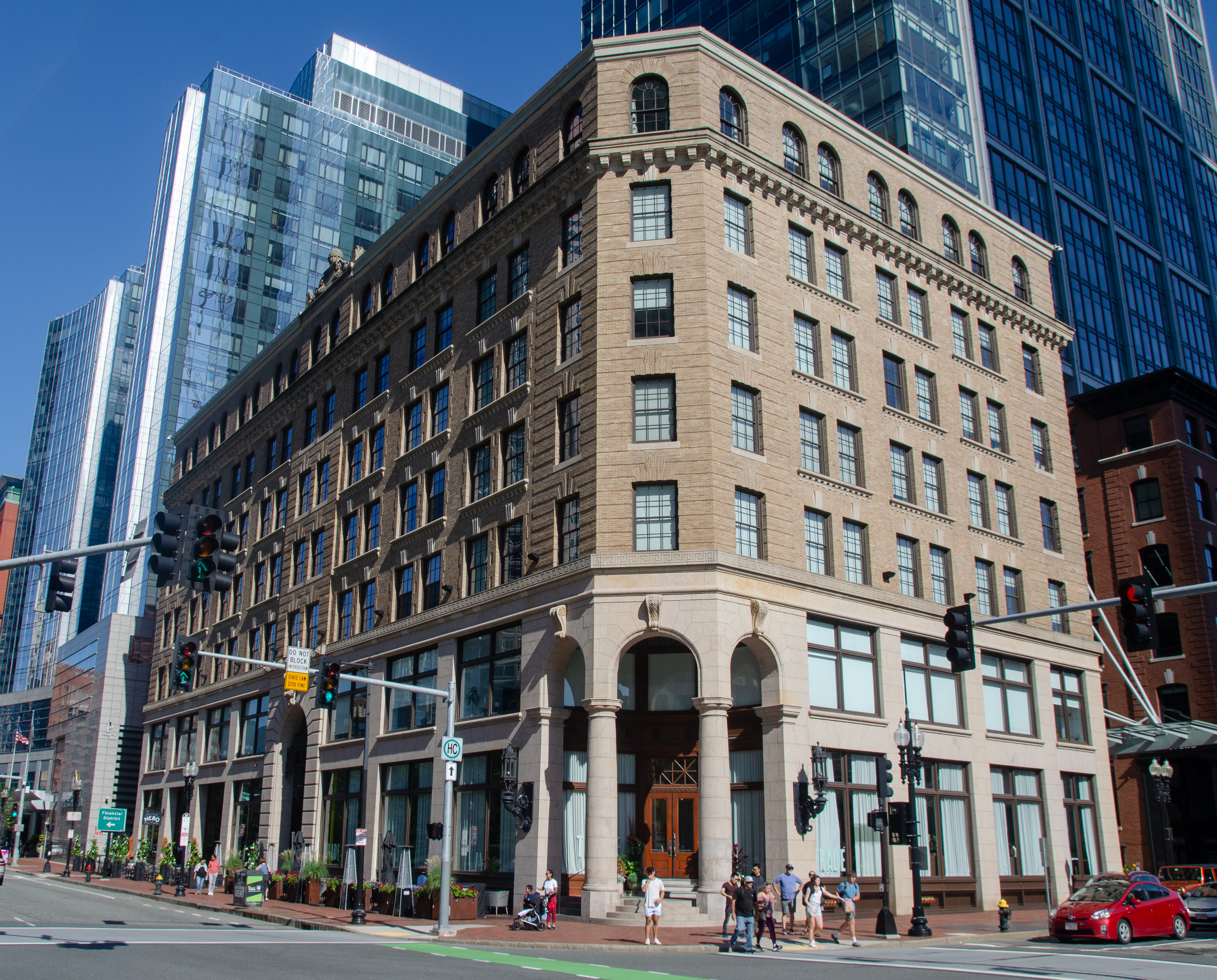
- 518–540 Atlantic Ave. (2023)

- Location within Boston Location within Massachusetts Location within the United States
- Location: 518–540 Atlantic Ave. 270 Congress St. 276–290 Congress St. Boston, Massachusetts
- Coordinates: 42°21′12″N 71°3′11″W
- Area: 2.2 acres (0.89 ha)
- Built: 1898
- Architect: Peabody & Stearns; multiple
- Architectural style: Colonial Revival
- NRHP reference No.: 80000463
- Added to NRHP: December 2, 1980

The Russia Wharf Buildings are a cluster of three stylistically similar commercial buildings at 518–540 Atlantic Avenue, 270 Congress Street and 276–290 Congress Street in Boston, Massachusetts. They are built on the original site of Russia Wharf, near where the Boston Tea Party took place in 1773. The wharf was the center of Boston's trade with Russia in the late 18th and early 19th centuries. The wharf's buildings were destroyed in the Great Boston Fire of 1872, and the land area was extended by building over the wharf and filling the spaces surrounding it. The three Renaissance Revival buildings were designed by Peabody and Stearns and was built in 1897.

The buildings were listed on the National Register of Historic Places in 1980.

== Gallery ==
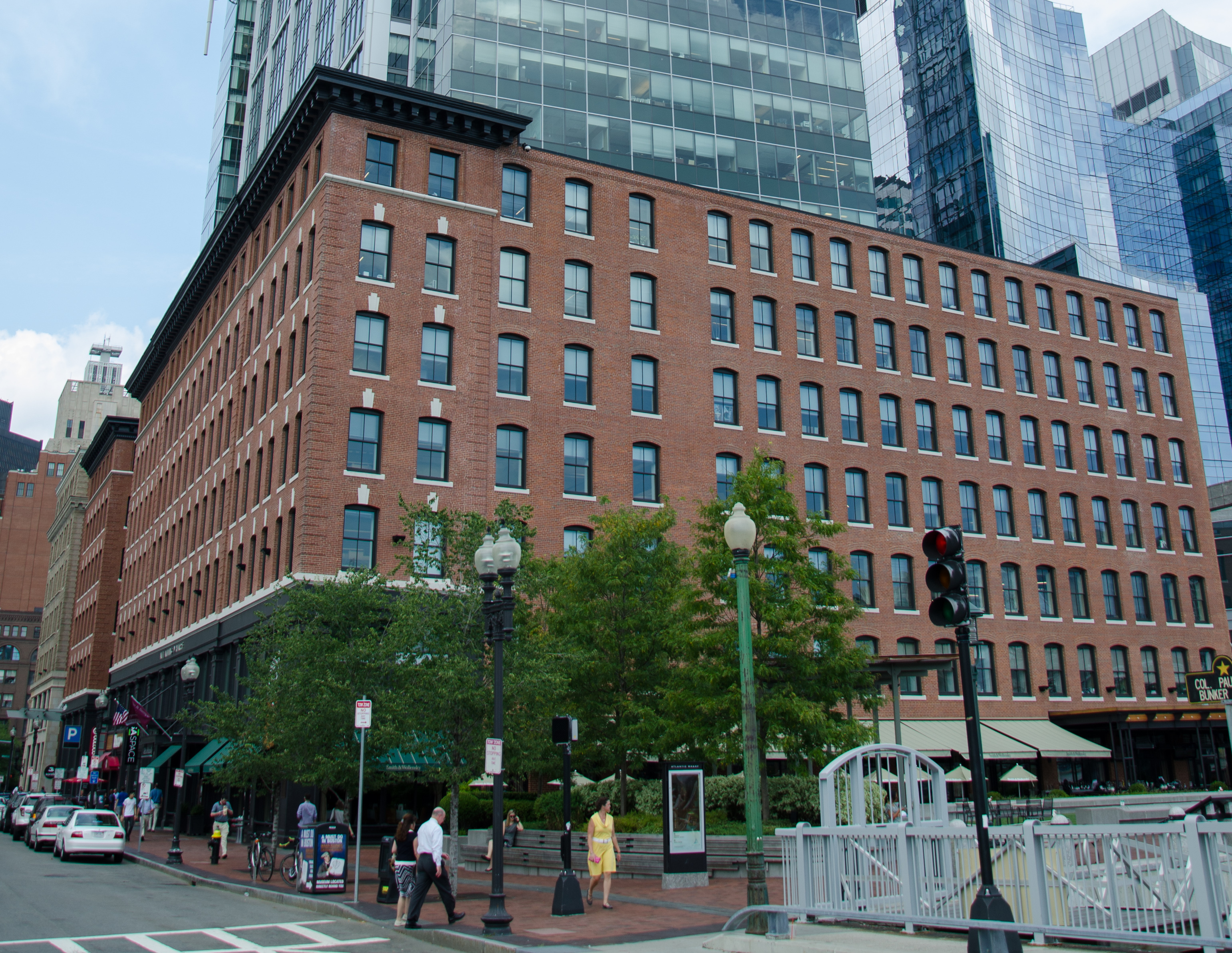
Russia Wharf (2014)

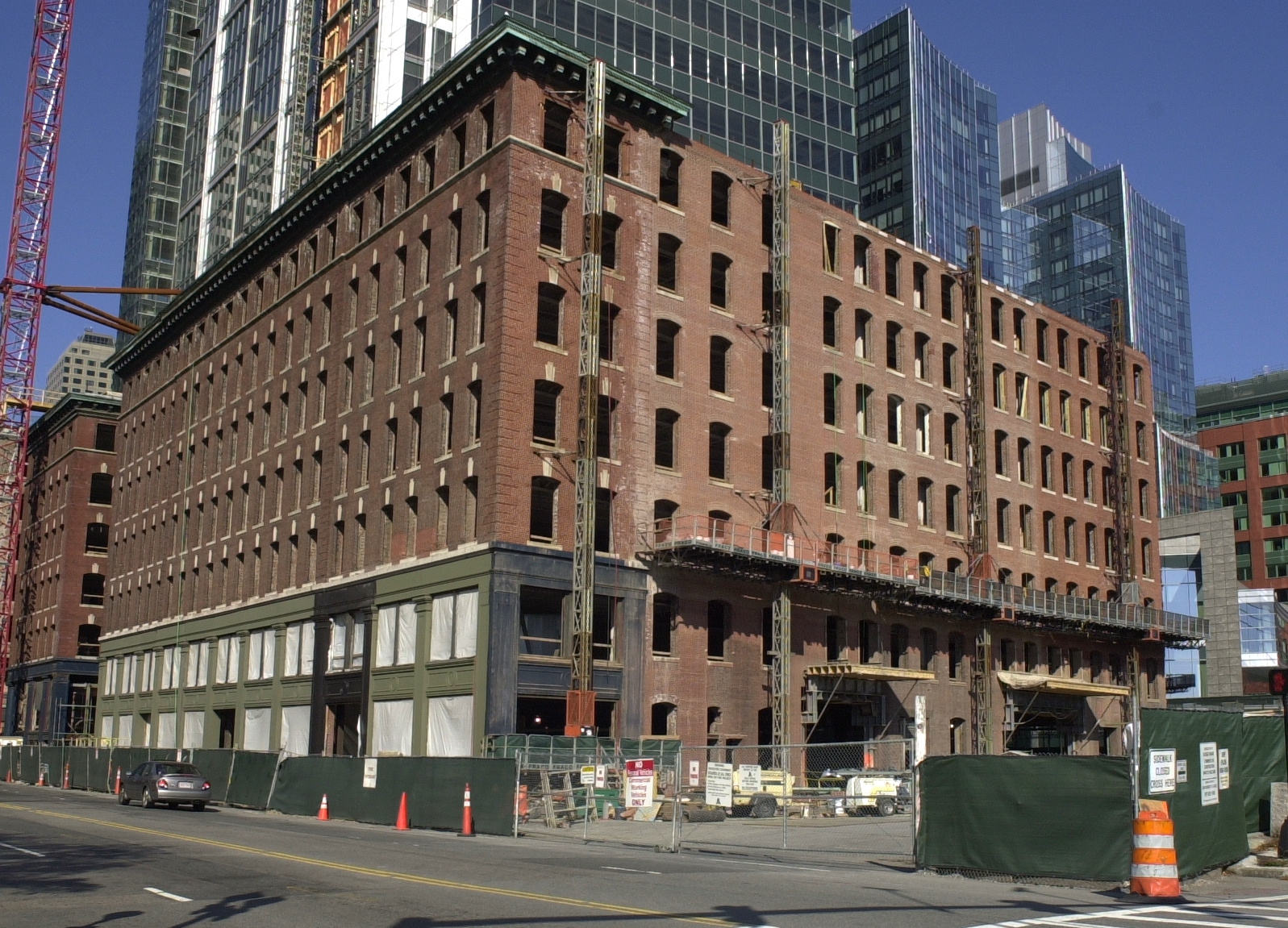
Building during restoration (2009)

== See also ==
- Russia Wharf, a modern skyscraper at 503 Atlantic Avenue
- National Register of Historic Places listings in northern Boston, Massachusetts
