= Boston Harbor Island Alliance =

- Merged into: Boston Harbor Now
- Formation: 1996; 30 years ago
- Dissolved: April 2016; 10 years ago
- Headquarters: Boston, Massachusetts

The Boston Harbor Island Alliance (also known as simply the "Island Alliance") was a 501(c)3 non-profit organization based in Boston, Massachusetts. As one of the many advocacy groups involved with the Boston Harbor Islands, the Island Alliance "promoted the use, enjoyment and awareness of the Boston Harbor Islands national park area".

The Island Alliance was established in 1996 solely to provide financial support to the Boston Harbor Islands National Recreation Area. It worked to attract capital investment from the private sector, and coordinates outside activities to secure financial support for the park system. The Island Alliance directly supported park facilities on the mainland (e.g. construction of the "Gateway" to the park system: the Boston Harbor Islands Pavilion), as well as the renovation of existing facilities (e.g. the Visitors' Centers located on Spectacle Island and Georges Island). The Island Alliance also provided financial management services for the other members of the Boston Harbor Islands Partnership. All members of the Partnership are expected to contribute some amount of funding toward park operations. However, the Island Alliance was the preferred vehicle of revenue generation and capital investment. In April of 2016, the Boston Harbor Island Alliance, merged with The Boston Harbor Association to become Boston Harbor Now.
