= Commonwealth Flats =

Coordinates: 42°20′55.46″N 71°2′16.43″W

Commonwealth Flats is a region of former mud flats in South Boston. It has been used over the years as the site of the South Boston Naval Annex, the South Boston Army Base, the Black Falcon Cruise Terminal and various other entities over the years.

What is now the Fort Point Channel Historic District was developed by the Boston Wharf Company from 1832 to the 1920s.
