= The Boston Harbor Association =

US nonprofit organization

- Abbreviation: TBHA
- Merged into: Boston Harbor Now
- Formation: 1973; 53 years ago
- Founder: League of Women Voters and the Boston Shipping Association
- Dissolved: April 1, 2016; 10 years ago
- Headquarters: Boston, Massachusetts
- Website: https://www.tbha.org

The Boston Harbor Association (TBHA) was a harbor advocacy group in Boston, Massachusetts. TBHA's goal was "to promote a clean, alive, and accessible Boston Harbor" through environmental protection programs and harbor activities, as well as providing public access to the harbor through the HarborWalk.

== History ==
The Boston Harbor Association was formed in 1973 by the League of Women Voters and the Boston Shipping Association. On April 1, 2016 the organization merged with the Boston Harbor Island Alliance to become Boston Harbor Now.

== HarborWalk ==
The Boston HarborWalk is a 46.9 mile public walkway that runs along the shore of Boston Harbor through Boston's six waterfront neighborhoods. The HarborWalk provides waterfront access to the public, and is accompanied by amenities such as cafés, parks, and seating areas. City and state regulations require new developments in Boston to be set back from the edge of the harbor. The HarborWalk was constructed as a way to both follow the building regulations and provide a pedestrian path for sightseeing and commerce.
