= Flynn Cruiseport Boston =

Port in Massachusetts, United States

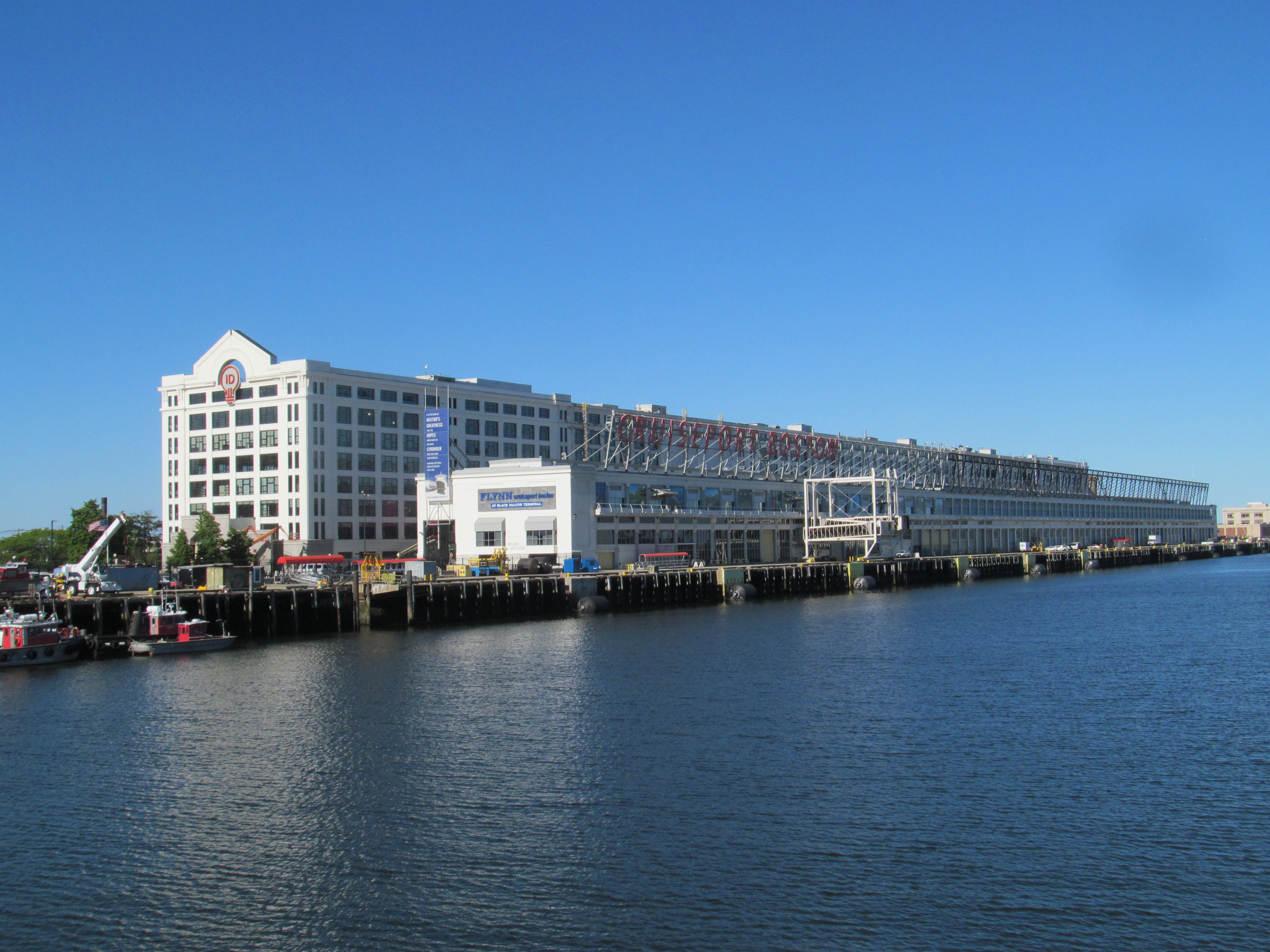
- Flynn Cruiseport Boston, with no ships docked
- Interactive map of Flynn Cruiseport Boston

Location
- Country: United States
- Location: Boston, Suffolk County, Massachusetts
- Coordinates: 42°21′48.96″N 71°2′11.77″W

Details
- Operated by: Massachusetts Port Authority (Massport)
- Owned by: Government of Massachusetts
- Type of harbour: Natural/Artificial
- No. of berths: 9
- Employees: 1,000
- Port Director: Lisa Wieland
- Draft depth: 35 feet

Statistics
- Passenger traffic: 370,312 (2023)
- Website http://www.massport.com/flynn-cruiseport/

Flynn Cruiseport Boston, formerly known as the Black Falcon Cruise Terminal, is the main port for all cruise ships visiting Boston, Massachusetts. The port is owned and operated by Massport, which operates most of the Port of Boston, and is located in the Seaport District of Boston. It is primarily open between the months of March and November, with its busiest season being in the early fall, as multiple Canada and New England cruises use Flynn Cruiseport as either a port of call or port of departure. In 2018, the port handled over 389,000 passengers, up over 26% from 2016. Massport handled 402,346 passengers with 138 calls by 34 different ships from 21 cruise lines in 2019.

== History ==
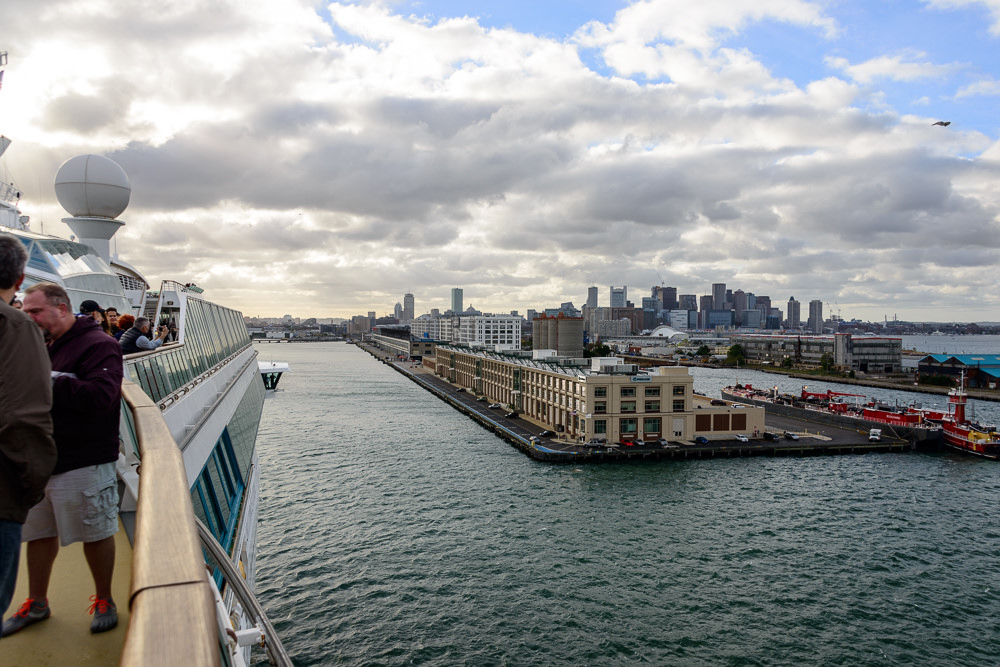
Flynn Cruiseport from a departing ship, with Downtown Boston in the background

Originally called Black Falcon Cruise Terminal, the port was renamed in 2017 to Flynn Cruiseport Boston after former Boston mayor Raymond Flynn. Flynn opened the cruise terminal in 1986, and in its first year the port hosted 13 ships and 11,723 passengers. The main portion of the terminal underwent an $11 million renovation in 2010, while the secondary terminal was renovated in 2015 for a total of $3.2 million.

== Ships ==
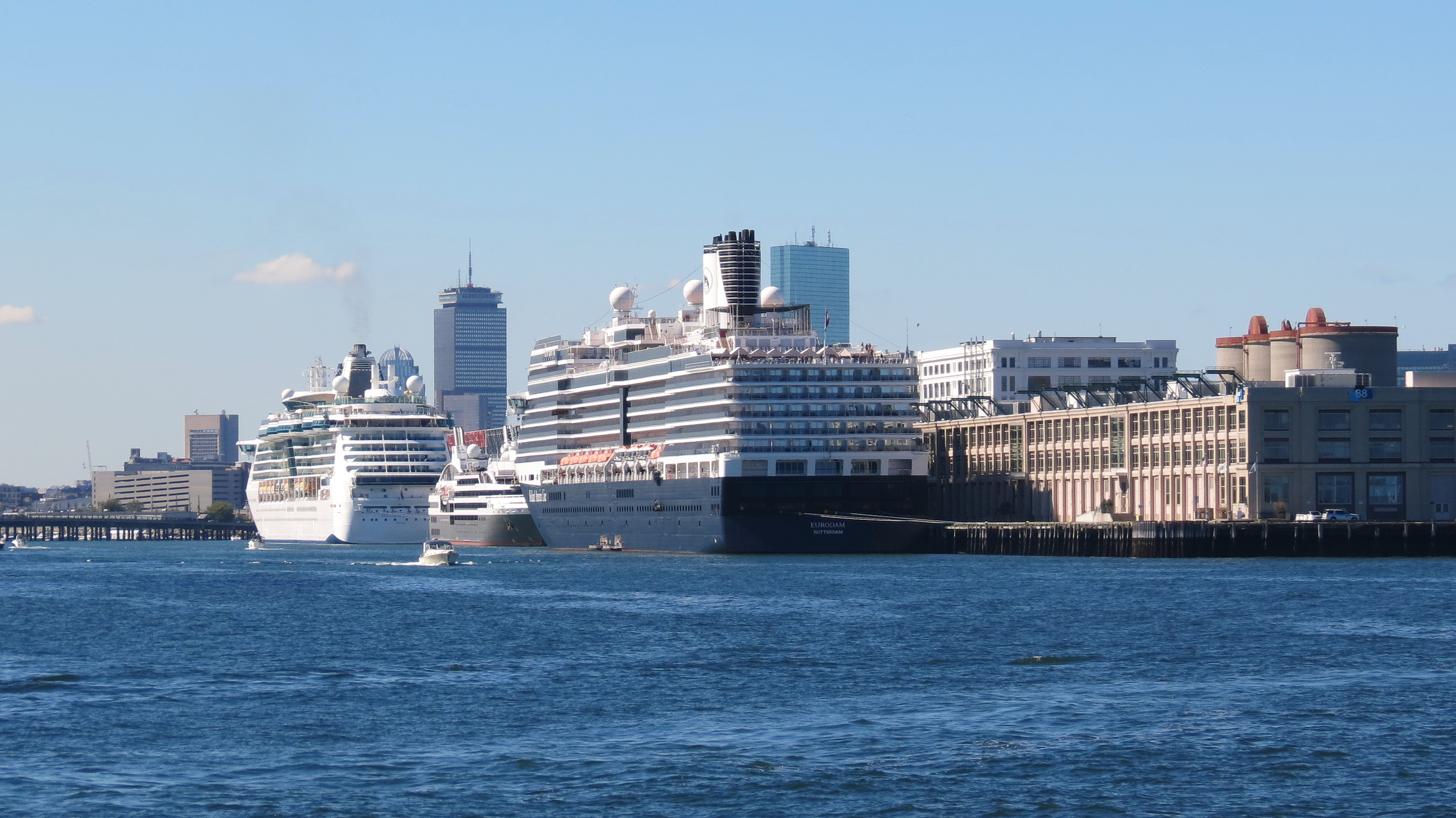
Three ships docked at Flynn Cruiseport

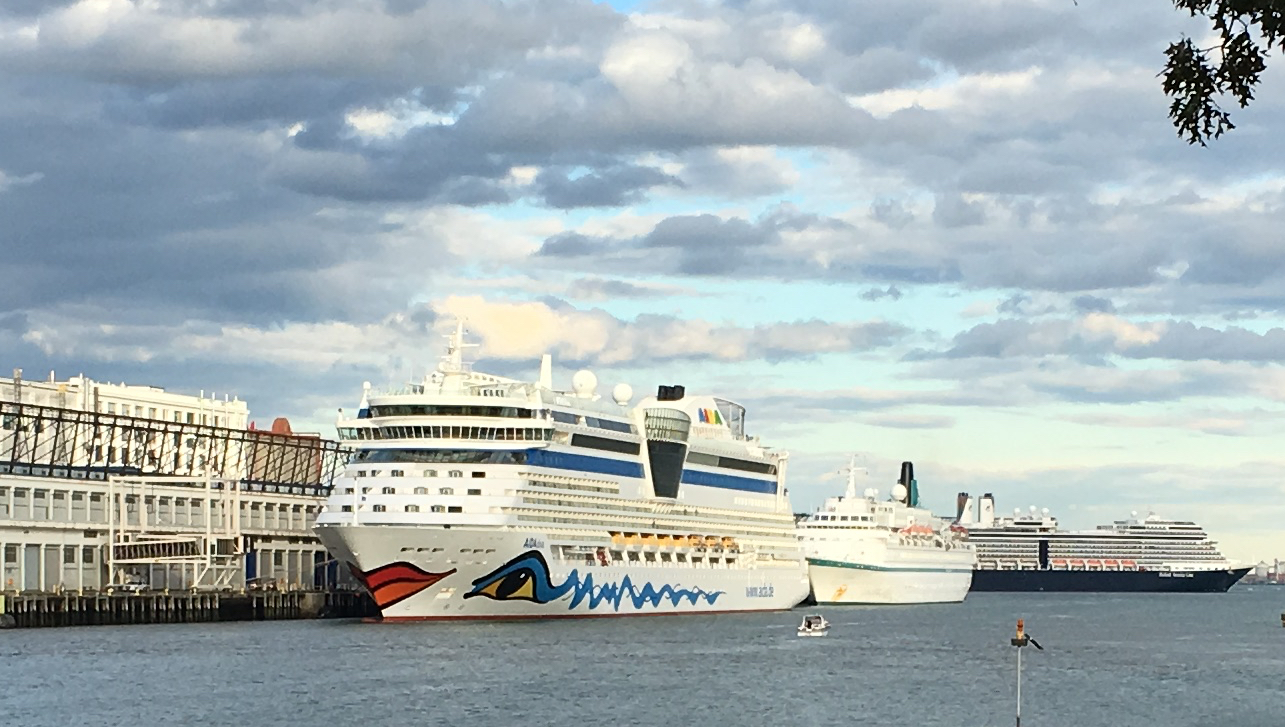
From left to right: AIDAdiva, Albatross, and Eurodam at the cruise terminal

In 2019, six ships were scheduled to utilize Flynn Cruiseport as their port of departure. The ships sail for Norwegian Cruise Line, Holland America Line, Royal Caribbean International, and the Seabourn. These ships include:

- Norwegian Gem
- Maasdam
- Rotterdam
- Veendam
- Serenade of the Seas
- Seabourn Quest

== Statistics ==
Massport reports that Flynn Cruiseport supports 1,000 jobs in the Boston area, as well as generates $56 million in business revenue. The port regularly reports its passenger volume numbers for each month it is in operation. Due to the COVID-19 pandemic, no passenger ships departed from or made a port of call at the cruiseport in 2020. Yearly totals can be seen in the table below, with 2023 being updated through November.

Volumes	2015	2016	2017	2018	2019	2020	2021	2022	2023
Total	328,305	309,027	388,222	389,619	402,346	0	1,668	310,699	370,312
Percent change from year before	4%	-6%	24%	0.4%	3%	-100%		18,527%	19%
