= Santarpio's Pizza =

Pizza shop

Coordinates: 42.3727°N 71.0353°W

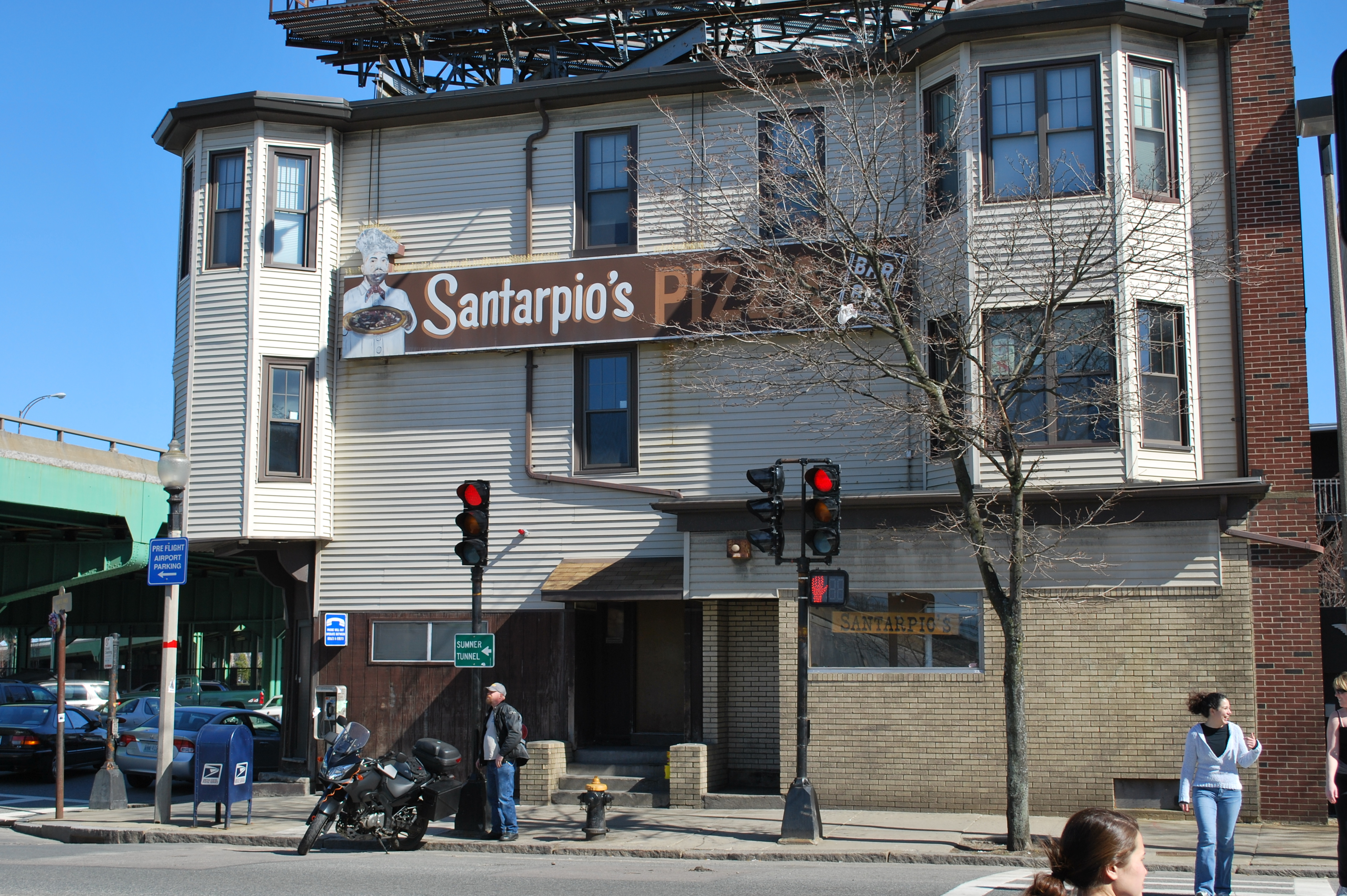
- Santarpio's original location in East Boston in 2009
- Interactive map of Santarpio's Pizza

Restaurant information
- Established: 1903; 123 years ago (re-founded 1933; 93 years ago)
- Location: 111 Chelsea Street, East Boston, Massachusetts, 02128, United States
- Other locations: Peabody, Massachusetts
- Website: www.santarpiospizza.com

Santarpio's Pizza is a restaurant on Chelsea Street in East Boston, Massachusetts, United States. Established in 1903 as a bakery by Frank Santarpio, it began selling pizza in 1933. The sign for Santarpio's Pizza can be seen from the highway on the way to the Boston airport.

== History ==
The restaurant was one of the original pizzerias that opened to cater to Italian Americans who had emigrated to East Boston and the surrounding neighborhoods. Still owned and operated by the Santarpio family, its menu also features barbecued lamb, steak tips, chicken, and sausage.

Glenn Carlton has baked bread and prepared dough for the pizzas at Santarpio's for 30 years. Lennie Timpone, whose mother was a Santarpio, was born in 1945 and has worked at the Chelsea Street location his entire life.

=== Expansion ===
For over a century, Santarpio's operated exclusively out of its original East Boston location. The restaurant's long-term resistance to growth was primarily attributed to the philosophy of Frank Santarpio (third generation), who managed the business for over 40 years and was famously hesitant to expand to ensure the "old-world" quality and specific atmosphere of the original shop were maintained.

Following Frank's retirement in 2005, the fourth generation of the family—children Carla, Joia, and Frank Jr.—began actively planning for expansion. This led to the 2010 opening of a second location on Route 1 in Peabody. This site, managed by Carla Santarpio, is significantly larger than the original and introduced menu items such as salads, which were historically absent from the East Boston menu.

In March 2020, the business expanded further with a location at Logan International Airport in Terminal C as part of the airport's modernization project. Despite the expansion, the family has maintained its conservative approach to growth to preserve the brand's quality.

== Recognition ==
- Food & Wine named it in their list of best pizza places in the US.
- In 2012, Santarpio's was featured on Bizarre Foods America.
