= East Boston Immigration Station =

Government facility in Massachusetts, US

Coordinates: 42°21′48.45″N 71°1′51.65″W

The East Boston Immigration Station was an immigration station in East Boston that was built from 1919 to 1920 and operational from 1920 to 1954. In 1959, it was declared surplus and sold to the highest bidder. As of 2010, it is owned by Massport and leased as a shipyard. It is located directly to the east of the former Bethlehem Atlantic Works.

At the start of World War II, it was used as a detention center for Japanese, German and Italian immigrants deemed potentially dangerous by the government (many of whom had resided in the United States for decades and despite a lack of evidence proving their supposed risk). Their internment at East Boston was temporary; all were later transferred to more permanent facilities.

== See also ==
- Demographics of Boston
