= Trinity Neighborhood House =

- U.S. National Register of Historic Places
- U.S. Historic district – Contributing property
- Boston Landmark
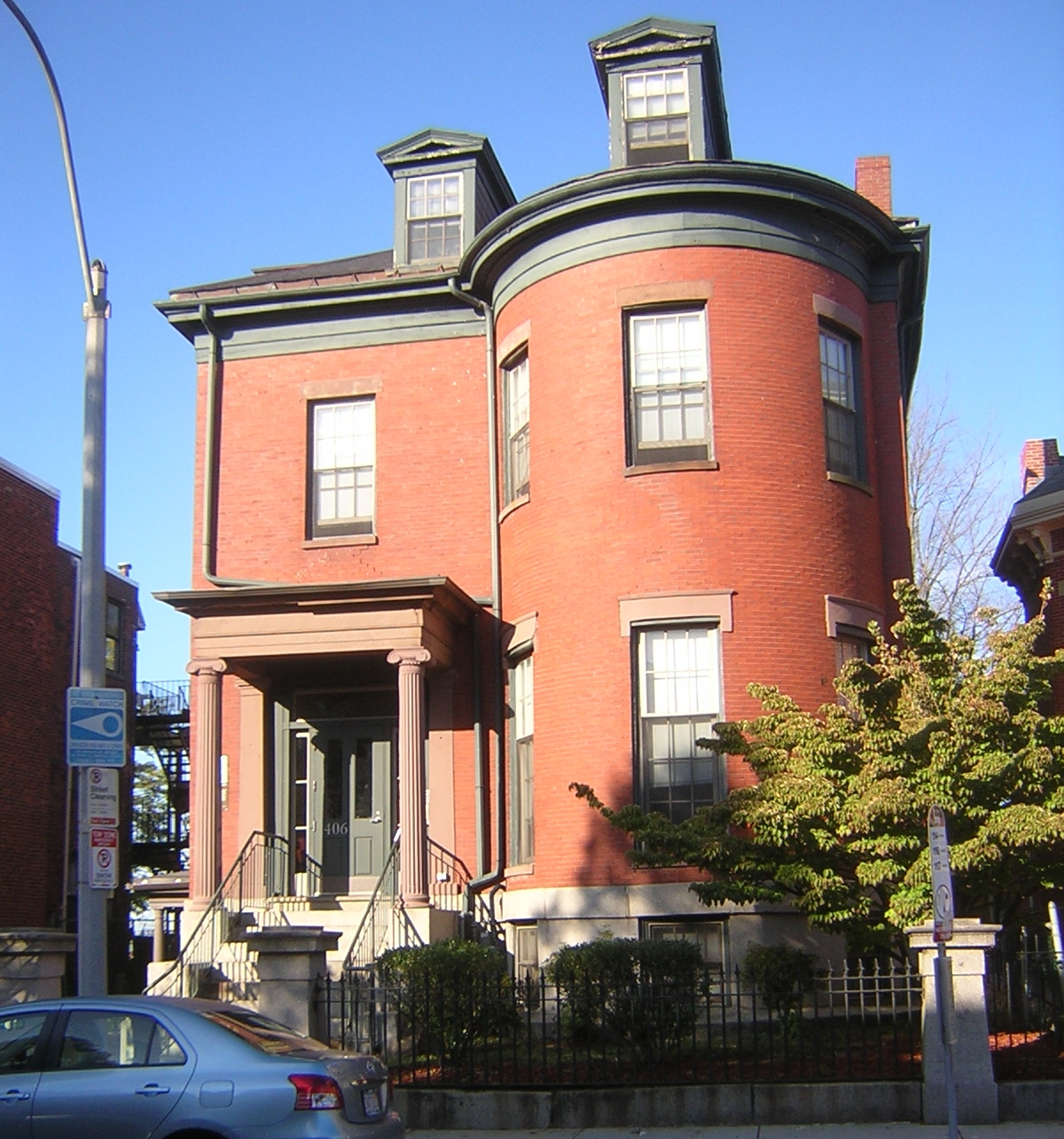
- The Trinity Neighborhood House in 2009.

- Location within Boston Location within Massachusetts Location within the United States
- Location: East Boston, Massachusetts
- Coordinates: 42°22′49″N 71°2′22.6″W
- Area: 0.25 acres (0.10 ha)
- Built: 1847
- Architectural style: Greek Revival
- Part of: Eagle Hill Historic District (ID98000149)
- NRHP reference No.: 92000356

Significant dates
- Added to NRHP: April 14, 1992
- Designated CP: February 26, 1998
- Designated BOSL: June 23, 1981

The Trinity Neighborhood House is a historic brick townhouse at 406 Meridian Street located in the Eagle Hill section of East Boston, Massachusetts.

== History ==
The house was built in 1847 for entrepreneur Noah Sturtevant and was thus named the Noah Sturtevant House. In 1917, it was named the Trinity Neighborhood House and Day Nursery. Since 1888, it operated as a social service center and philanthropy of Trinity Church. The building is now owned by Neighborhood of Affordable Housing, Inc. and is a 16-unit single resident occupancy (SRO) facility for the formerly homeless.

The House had long been a beneficiary of many notable events. On November 19, 1957, comedian Anna Russell held a concert at Jordan Hall in Boston to benefit the House. On May 8, 1958, noted archaeologist Byron Khun de Prorok gave a fundraising lecture at the New England Mutual Hall. On February 4, 1960, a screening of the film Sweet Love Remember'd starring Margaret Sullavan was scheduled to benefit the House, but due to her untimely passing, the show was cancelled. The show was replaced with Laurence Olivier's The Tumbler.

In 1981, the building was designated a Boston Landmark by the Boston Landmarks Commission and it was later added to the National Register of Historic Places in 1992.

== See also ==
- National Register of Historic Places listings in northern Boston, Massachusetts
