= Eagle Hill Historic District =

Historic district in Massachusetts, United States

- U.S. National Register of Historic Places
- U.S. Historic district
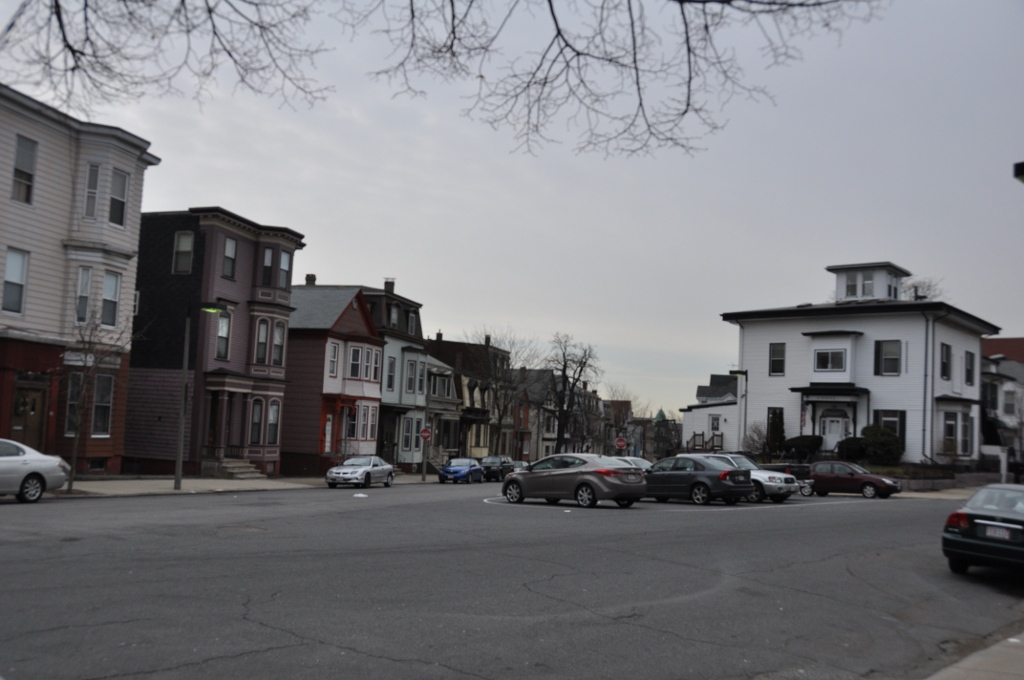
- Monmouth Square on Eagle Hill

- Location within Boston Location within Massachusetts Location within the United States
- Location: East Boston, Boston, Massachusetts
- Coordinates: 42°22′51.23″N 71°2′5.33″W
- Area: 40 acres (16 ha)
- Architectural style: Greek Revival, Italianate, Classical Revival
- NRHP reference No.: 98000149
- Added to NRHP: February 26, 1998

The Eagle Hill Historic District is a residential historic district roughly bounded by Meridian, Princeton, and White Streets meeting in Prescott Square in the East Boston neighborhood of Boston, Massachusetts, United States. This part of East Boston was developed roughly between 1834 and 1900, and includes a remarkable concentration of original housing stock. The neighborhood is dense, with a mix of single-family and multiple-family (generally two- or three-unit) wood frame housing. The majority of these buildings is Italianate, Second Empire or Renaissance Revival in style, with earlier Greek Revival and later Colonial Revival and Queen Anne styling present in smaller numbers. Some of the most prominent properties in the district are: the Donald McKay House (78-80 White St), Trinity Neighborhood House (406 Meridian St.), the Paul Curtis Mansion (402 Meridian St.), and the William Waters Jr. House (57 Trenton St.). Another noteworthy property in the district is the East Boston High School located at the top of the hill, built on a site formerly used as a reservoir.

The district was added to the National Register of Historic Places in 1998.

== See also ==
- National Register of Historic Places listings in northern Boston, Massachusetts
