= East Boston =

Neighborhood of Boston, Massachusetts, U.S.

- Neighborhood of Boston
- An American Airlines Boeing 727 approaching Logan International Airport in 1973

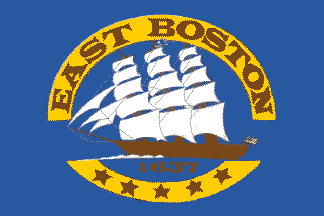
- Flag
- Nicknames: Eastie
- Neighborhood map of East Boston, Massachusetts

- Location within Greater Boston area Location within Massachusetts Location within the United States
- Coordinates: 42°22′30″N 71°02′21″W
- Country: United States
- State: Massachusetts
- County: Suffolk
- Neighborhood of: Boston
- Annexed by Boston: 1836

Area
  - Land: 4.7 sq mi (12 km^{2})

Population (2010)
  - Total: 40,508
  - Density: 8,618/sq mi (3,327/km^{2})
- Time zone: UTC-5 (Eastern)
- Zip Code: 02128, 02228
- Area code: 617 / 857
- Website: www.eastboston.com

East Boston, nicknamed Eastie, is a neighborhood of Boston, Massachusetts, United States, which was annexed by the city of Boston in 1836. Neighboring communities include Winthrop, Revere, and Chelsea. It is separated from the Boston neighborhood of Charlestown and downtown Boston by Boston Harbor. The final outline of East Boston, including Logan International Airport, was created in the 1940s by connecting five of the inner harbor islands using land fill.

East Boston has long provided homes for immigrants, such as the Irish, Russian Jews and later, Italians. John F. Kennedy's great-grandfather was one of many Irish people to immigrate to East Boston, and the Kennedy family lived there for some time. From 1920 to 1954, East Boston was the site of the East Boston Immigration Station, which served as the regional immigration hub for Boston and the surrounding area. A once Italian dominated community, East Boston has demographically changed to reflect a diverse population of immigrants. Since the 1990s, the neighborhood has witnessed growing numbers of Latin American immigrants, who have come to make up over fifty percent of the population according to the 2020 Census data.

== History ==
The landmass that is East Boston today originally comprised five islands sited east of the confluence of the Malden, Mystic, and Charles rivers, and across the harbor from the westerly city of Boston. These islands included: Noddle's; Hog's; Governor's; Bird; and Apple. The town of East Boston was first developed on the largest of these, Noddle's, a noted source of timber and grazing land, used for farming by English colonists throughout the eighteenth century.

William H. Sumner

=== Early development of the city ===
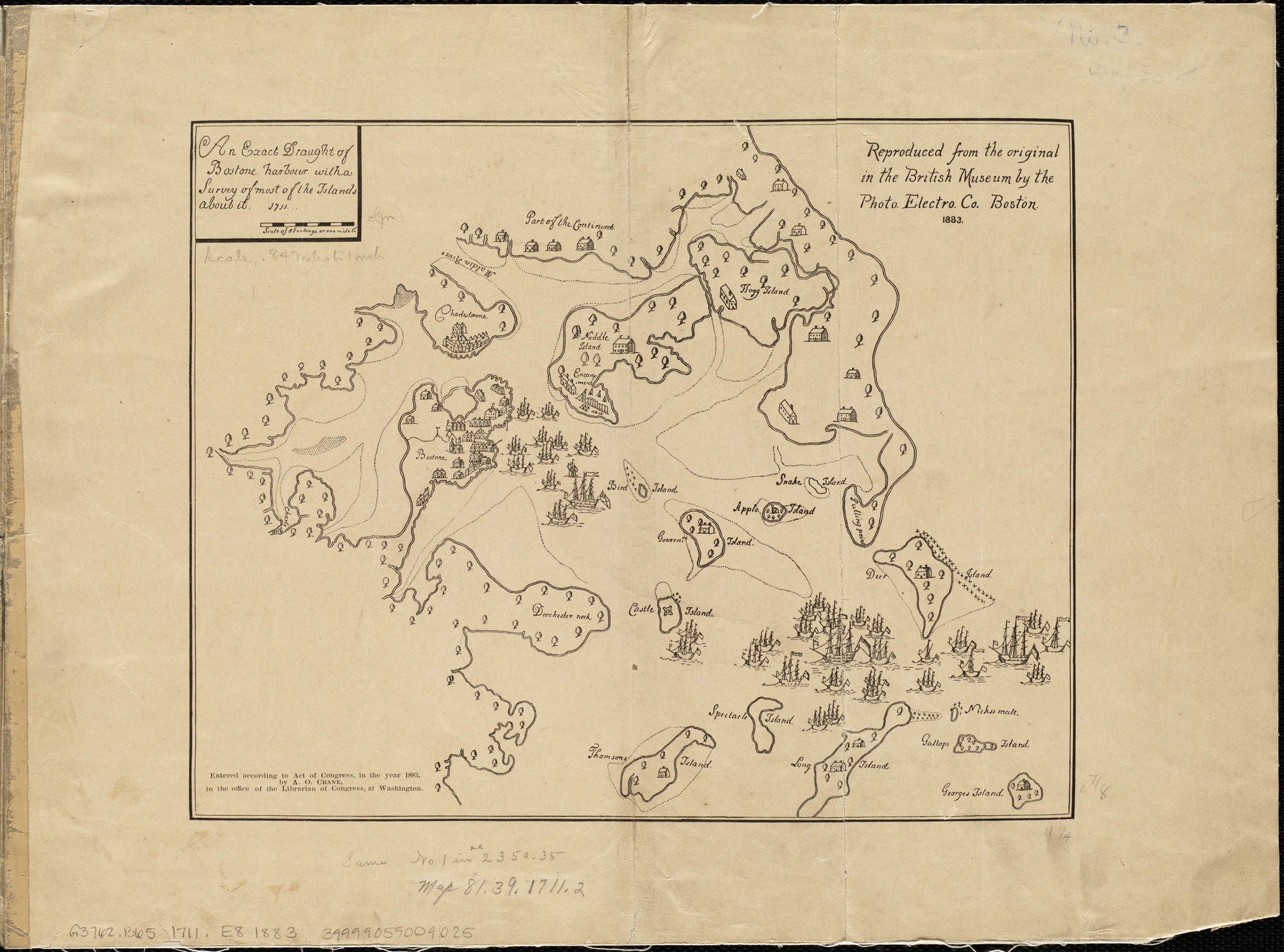
Boston Harbor, including Noddle's, Hog's, Governor's, Bird's and Apple Islands (1711)

==== Sumner and Noddle's Island ====
As early as 1801, William H. Sumner, who had inherited a large tract on Noddle's Island, proposed that the federal government of the United States create a turnpike to connect Massachusett's North Shore (along with Sumner's property on Noddle's) to Boston, arguing that such a road would create a valuable, direct route across Boston's harbor, making it easier for Boston, at the time an isolated peninsula surrounded by water, to expand: "There is no doubt but that the necessities of the town of Boston will some time require a connection with Noddle's Island." When this plan was rejected in favor of a route through Chelsea (a route, not coincidentally, that left the Boston navy yard in nearby Charlestown with ocean access), Sumner moved onto other plans to improve Noddle's value.

By 1833, Sumner, with partners Steven White and Francis J. Oliver, had bought up half of Noddle's acreage. Together, they founded the East Boston Company, and continued to consolidate additional landholdings. By 1834, the East Boston Company had complete control over the island. The company's purpose was to own and develop the land and call it East Boston. In anticipation of population growth, the proprietors adopted a grid street plan, the first planned neighborhood in the city of Boston. Jeffries Point, located at the southern end of the peninsula that faced Boston, was the earliest area of East Boston to be settled.

A bridge to Chelsea was built, roads were laid out, and houses were built. Much of this activity was spurred by the formation of the East Boston Lumber Company. During this period, the Boston Sugar Refinery was also founded, which was the first manufacturing establishment in East Boston. They are credited for the creation of white granulated sugar.

East Boston in 1838

==== The Boston Shipyards and Donald McKay ====
By 1835, ten wharves had been built. The abundance of wharf area opened the new East Boston to further rapid expansion, and it was the shipbuilding companies that soon became East Boston's most famous industry, and the mainstay of its economy. In 1836, as development began to totally change the former islands, East Boston was annexed to Boston.

In 1845, Donald McKay, as a sole owner, established his own shipyard on Border Street. His ships included the Flying Cloud (1851), which made two 89-day passages from New York to San Francisco, and the Sovereign of the Seas (1852), which posted the fastest speed ever by a sailing ship (22 knots) in 1854.

In the 1840s and 1850s, the principal shipbuilders besides McKay included Paul Curtis and Samuel Hall. In addition, Sylvanus Smith became a noted shipbuilder in East Boston.

=== Connections to the mainland ===
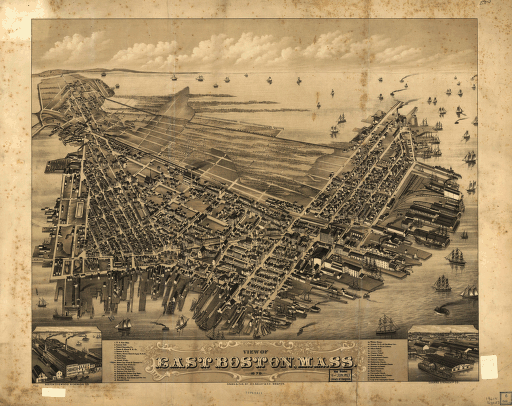
East Boston in 1879

In the 1830s, the largest problem keeping East Boston from thriving was transportation. The East Boston Company believed the neighborhood could not become a valuable asset until people had a way to reach the area from the Boston mainland. As a temporary solution, they set up a paddle steamer to carry 15 people at a time from Boston Proper to the neighborhood. It was used primarily for occasional visits from public officials and laborers. Though they did not have the ridership to support additional boats, the company purchased the Tom Thumb steamboat.

The steam railroad system was still in its infancy at this point, and the East Boston Company was approached by an inventor of a new type of rail system, the suspension railway. This system was one of the earliest suspended railroads to be built. The railroad cars were propelled by a steam engine hanging from a suspended track. Henry Sargent, the inventor, stated "that his invention would make the Island a center of attraction to many people." The Company allowed it to be built on its land and it was in use for nine days in 1834, then closed citing lack of ridership.

In the mid-1830s, the company made several investments to further East Boston's development. They continued attempts to get the Eastern Railroad to come to East Boston. The Maverick and East Boston ferries began service from Lewis Wharf on the mainland to East Boston.

The ferry service from Noddle's Island was replaced in 1904 by the streetcar tunnel that became the MBTA Blue Line, the first underwater tunnel in North America.

=== Boston's "Ellis Island" ===
Since the mid-19th century, the community served as a foothold for immigrants to the United States: Irish and Canadians came first, followed by Russian Jews and Italians, then Southeast Asians, and, more recently, an influx from Central and South American countries. The Orient Heights section of East Boston was the first area in Massachusetts to which Italians immigrated in the 1860s and 1870s. The Madonna Shrine, which is the national headquarters of the Don Orione order, sits on top of the Heights and is a replica of the original religious structure in Rome. In the 1880s, the Immigrants House operated in East Boston to help immigrants during their arrivals with economic support and social services. The building in which the Immigrants House operated was later named Landfall and served as the first senior citizen housing in the community.

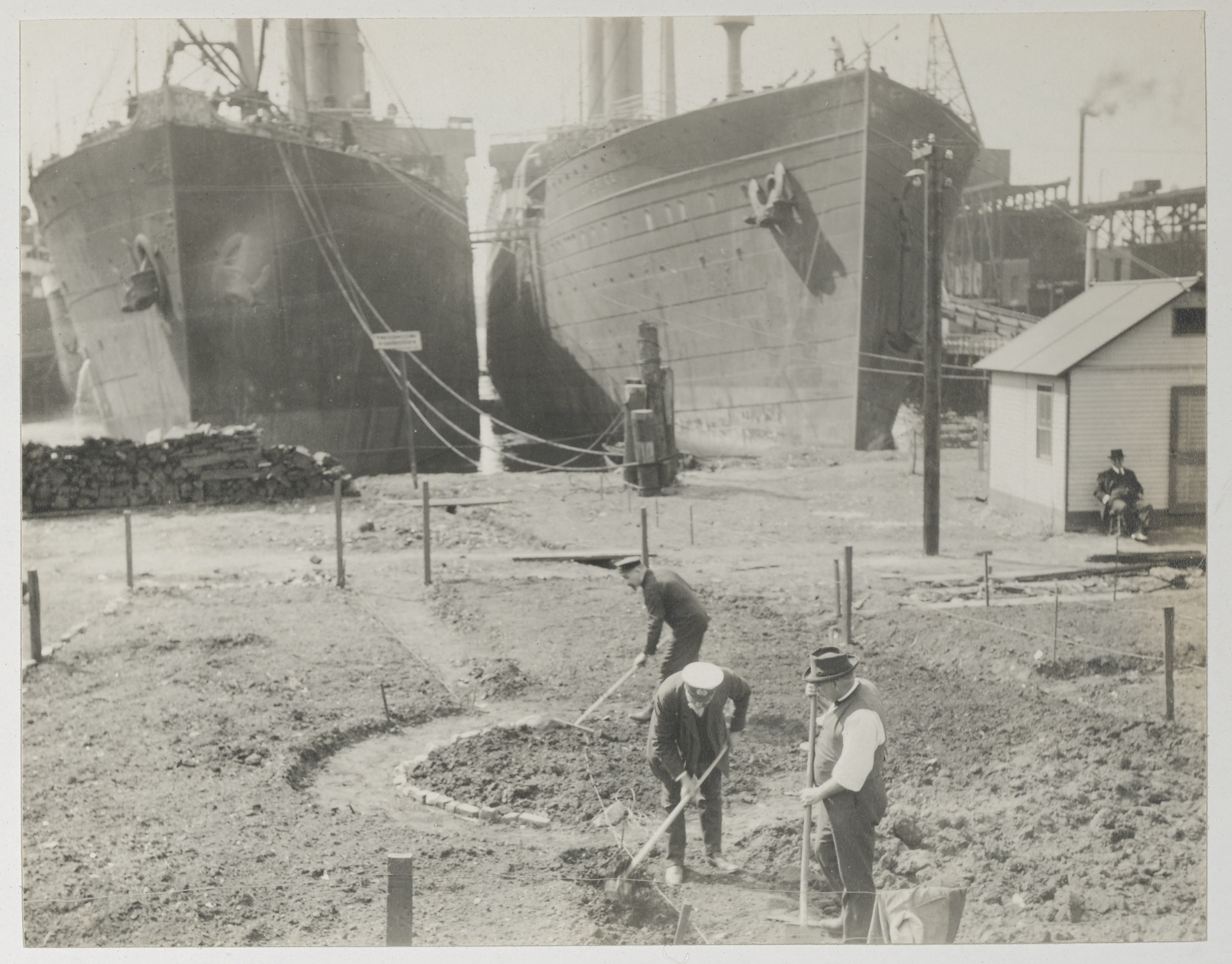
Internment Camps, East Boston, MA: German gardens, constructed by men of interned liners (1918)

During World War I, areas of East Boston served as an internment camp for Germans taken off of ships. Period images show small unfenced buildings and tiny gardens built by the internees, leading right up to the water's edge. In 1919, moves were undertaken to formalize these facilities. Originally officials planned to use one of the Harbor Islands to replace their rented quarters on Long Wharf, but this plan was abandoned for a site on Marginal Street, directly on the East Boston wharves. Construction began in late 1919 on the East Boston Immigration Station, which served as Boston's first purpose-built immigration station. The East Boston Immigration Station operated from 1920 to 1954 as the region's immigration hub. In 2011, the Immigration Station was torn down.

Unlike Ellis Island in New York, inspectors at the East Boston station processed immigrants at steamship docks, only transferring to the immigration station problem cases who had issues with their paperwork or required a secondary interview. Opposite the station, steps leading to East Boston were called the 'Golden Stairs' "because they represented the final climb to golden opportunity in America for countless Europeans." The station operated from 1920 to 1954 as the region's immigration hub.

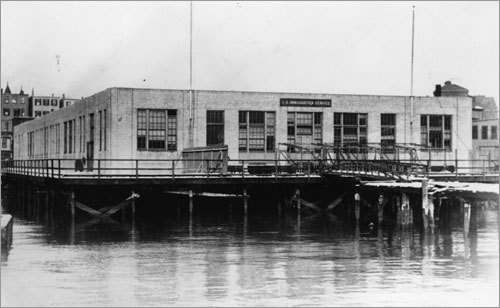
Waterfront view of the immigration station (c. 1922)

The population of East Boston, which was recorded as a mere thousand in 1837, exploded to a high of just over 64,000, according to the 1925 census. The sudden rise is attributed to the immigrants who came from Southern Italy. Today, the neighborhood is home to over 40,000 inhabitants, with a median income per household of around $46,000.

=== Kennedy family ===
When my great grandfather left here to become a cooper in East Boston, he carried nothing with him except two things: a strong religious faith and a strong desire for liberty. I am glad to say that all of his great grandchildren have valued that inheritance.

— President Kennedy addressing the people of New Ross, Ireland, June 1963

The family lived in a large home on Monmouth Street. P. J. Kennedy's success enabled him to purchase a home for his son, Joseph, and another for his two daughters at Jeffries Point.

In 1954, John F. Kennedy famously paraded through East Boston with his wife, Jackie, in anticipation for his campaign to run for United States Senate, to secure votes from the neighborhood. In a famous photograph, Kennedy is shown walking down Chelsea Street heading towards Maverick Square, waving to the crowd in front of Santarpio's Pizza.

On numerous occasions throughout his career in the United States Senate, Senator Ted Kennedy mentioned that his family's roots are embedded in East Boston.

== Geography ==
=== Maps ===
Neighborhood map

Open space map

== Sites of interest ==
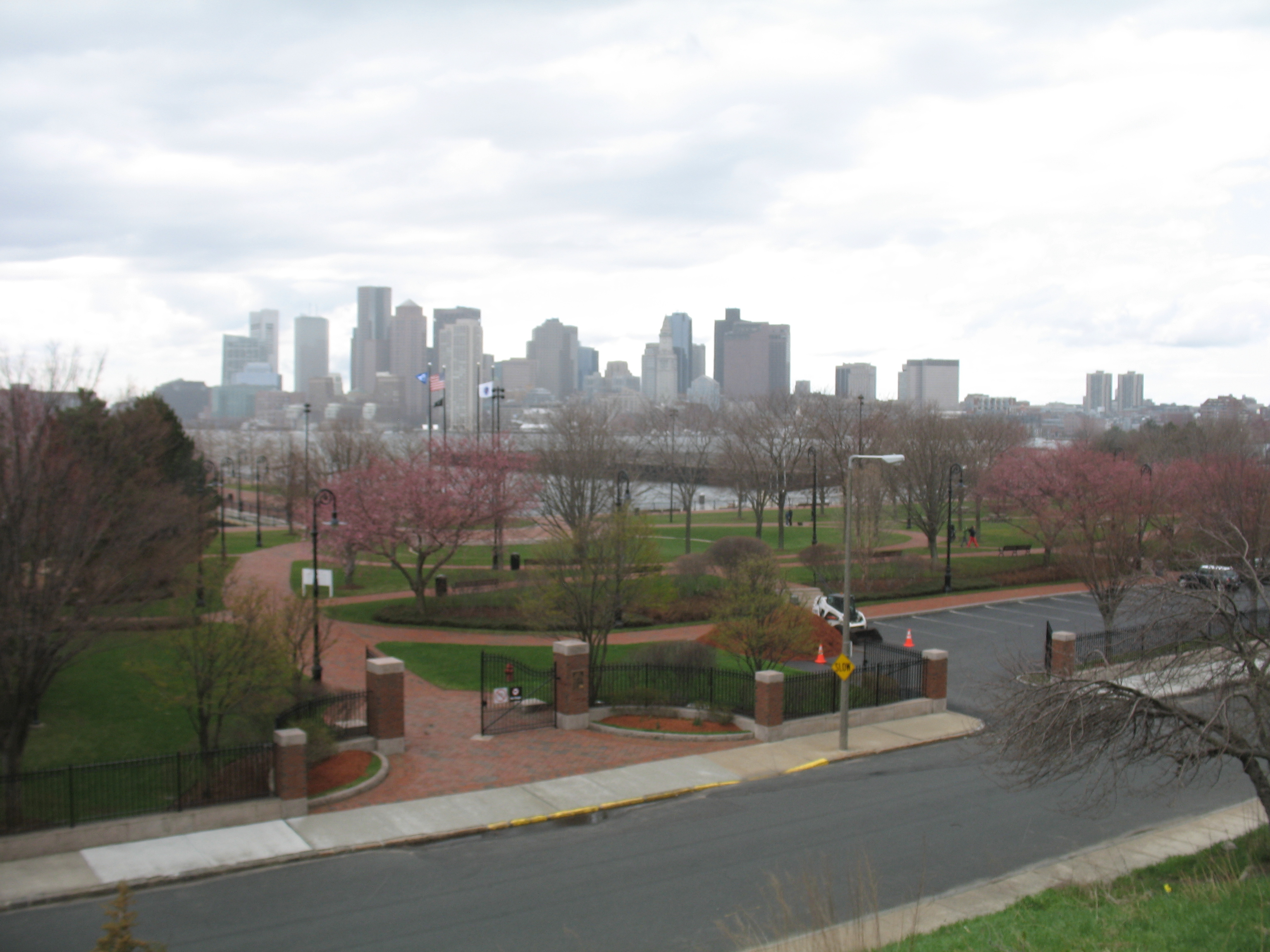
Piers Park with the downtown Boston skyline in the distance

=== Parks ===
- Belle Isle Marsh Reservation – The largest remaining salt marsh in Boston. It is a reserve for a variety of flora and fauna.
- Constitution Beach – Public beach in East Boston's Orient Heights neighborhood.
- Golden Stairs Terrace Park – Historic site immigration site, outdoor staircase from the former Boston Immigration center landing into East Boston; symbolically "the golden steps into opportunity," and the United States. Now a small public park.
- Piers Park – Public park constructed on top of an original 1870 seawall and pier, it includes a meandering brick pedestrian promenade and four shade pavilions, and the Piers Park Sailing Center. As of October 2022, Phase Two of the park's development by the Massachusetts Port Authority was expected to end in 2023. Phase Three, announced in 2020, is under the oversight of The Trustees of Reservations.

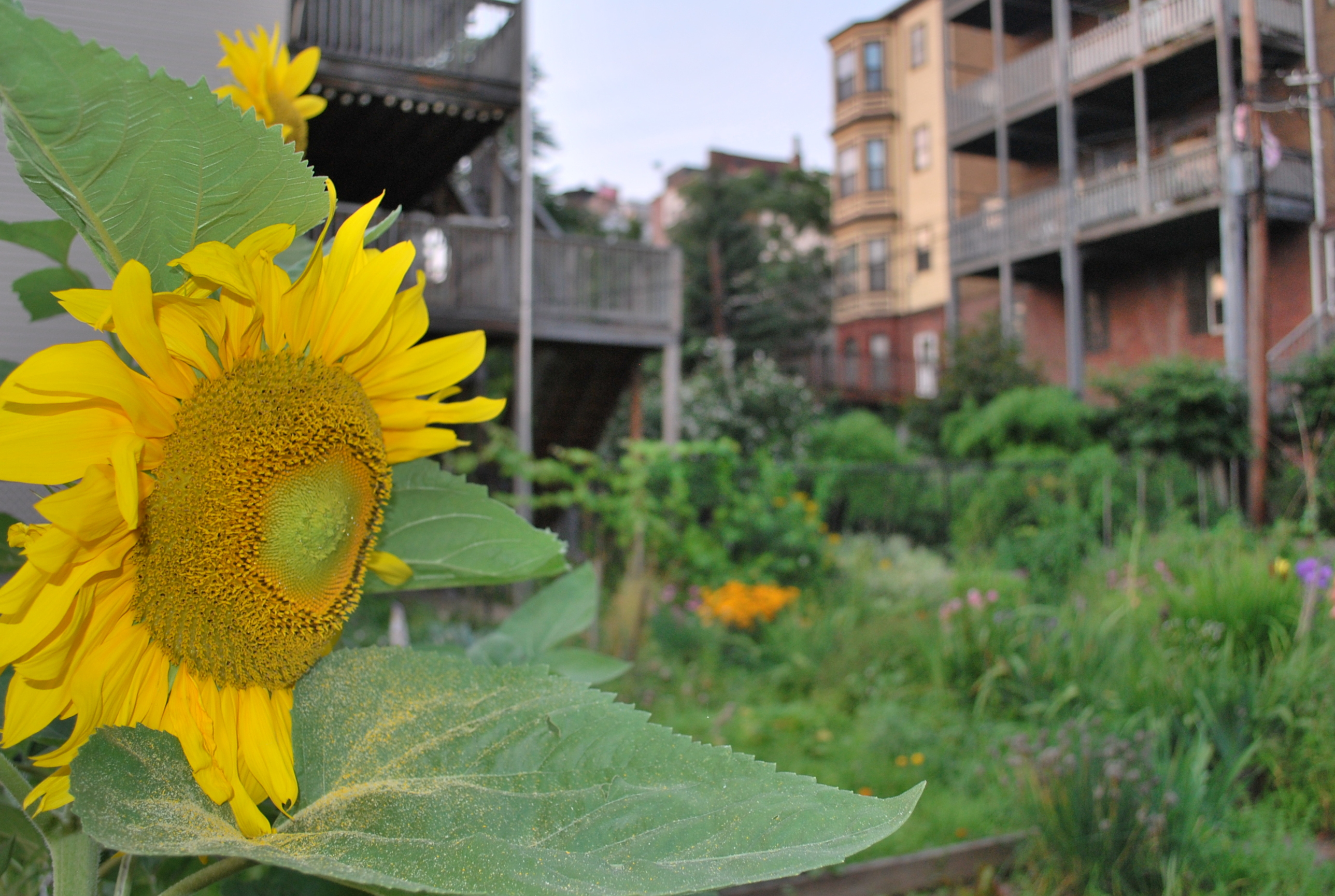
Sunflower blooming in Eagle Hill Memorial Community Garden in East Boston on Border Street

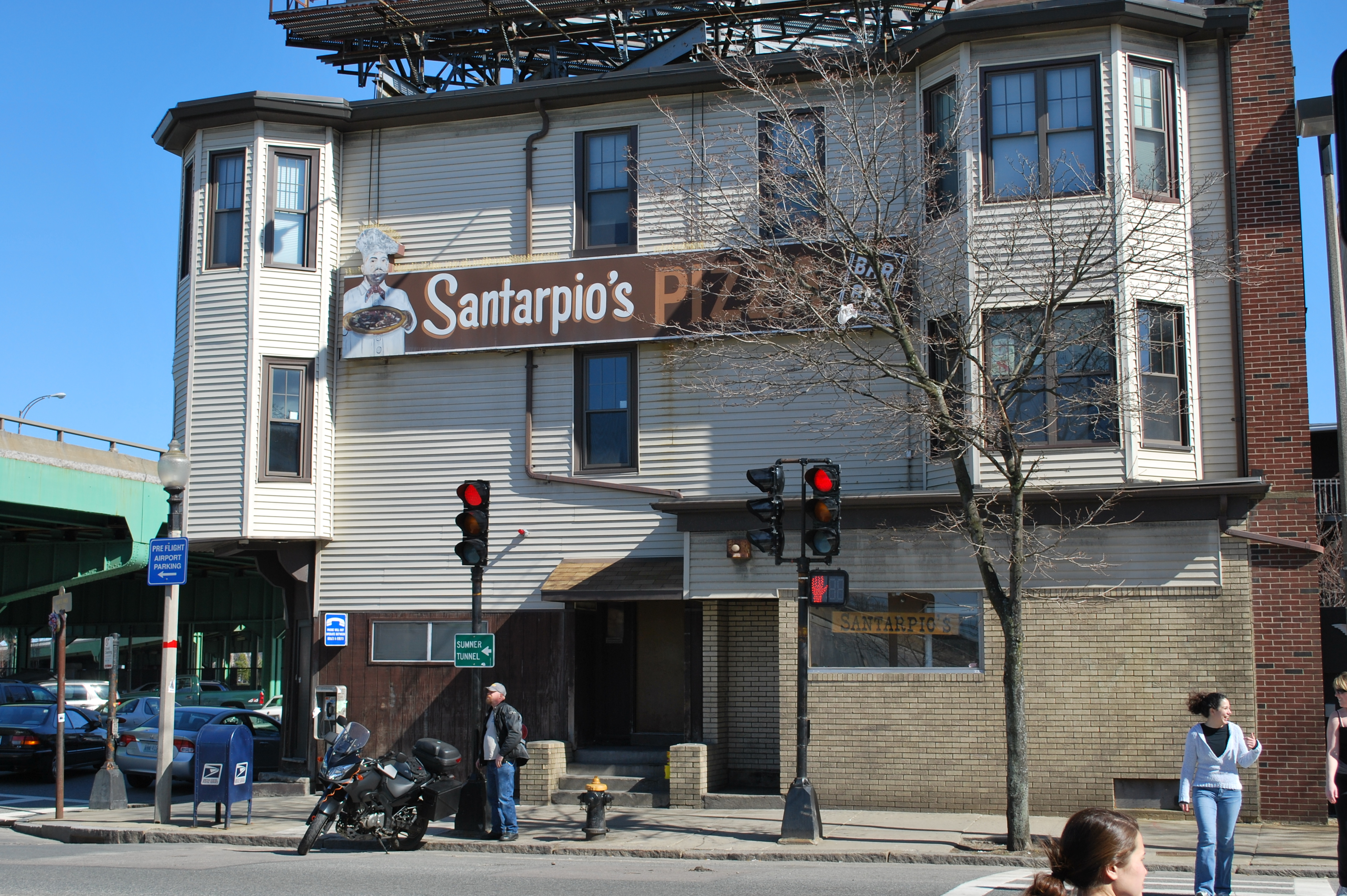
Santarpio's original location in East Boston in 2009

=== Community gardens ===
- Bremen Street Community Garden – The garden is located in the Bremen Street Park, that the Massachusetts Port Authority owns and operates. The garden is run by garden coordinators.
- Eagle Hill Community Garden sunflower blooming in the Eagle Hill Memorial Community Garden on Border Street. — The Trustees of Reservations maintains the garden in collaboration with residents.
- EBNHC Wellness Garden – The East Boston Neighborhood Health Center operates the garden to promote healthier lifestyles by giving garden plots to patients and Let's Get Movin' participants.
- Joe Ciampa Garden – The Trustees of Reservations maintains the garden in collaboration with residents.
- "Nuestro Jardín" ("Our Garden") – sited across from the Umana School, was formerly reserved for use by schoolchildren, but is now maintained by a community-based youth program and Eastie Farm, a non-profit that works in addressing the effects of food insecurity and climate change in East Boston.

=== Places of worship (past and present) ===
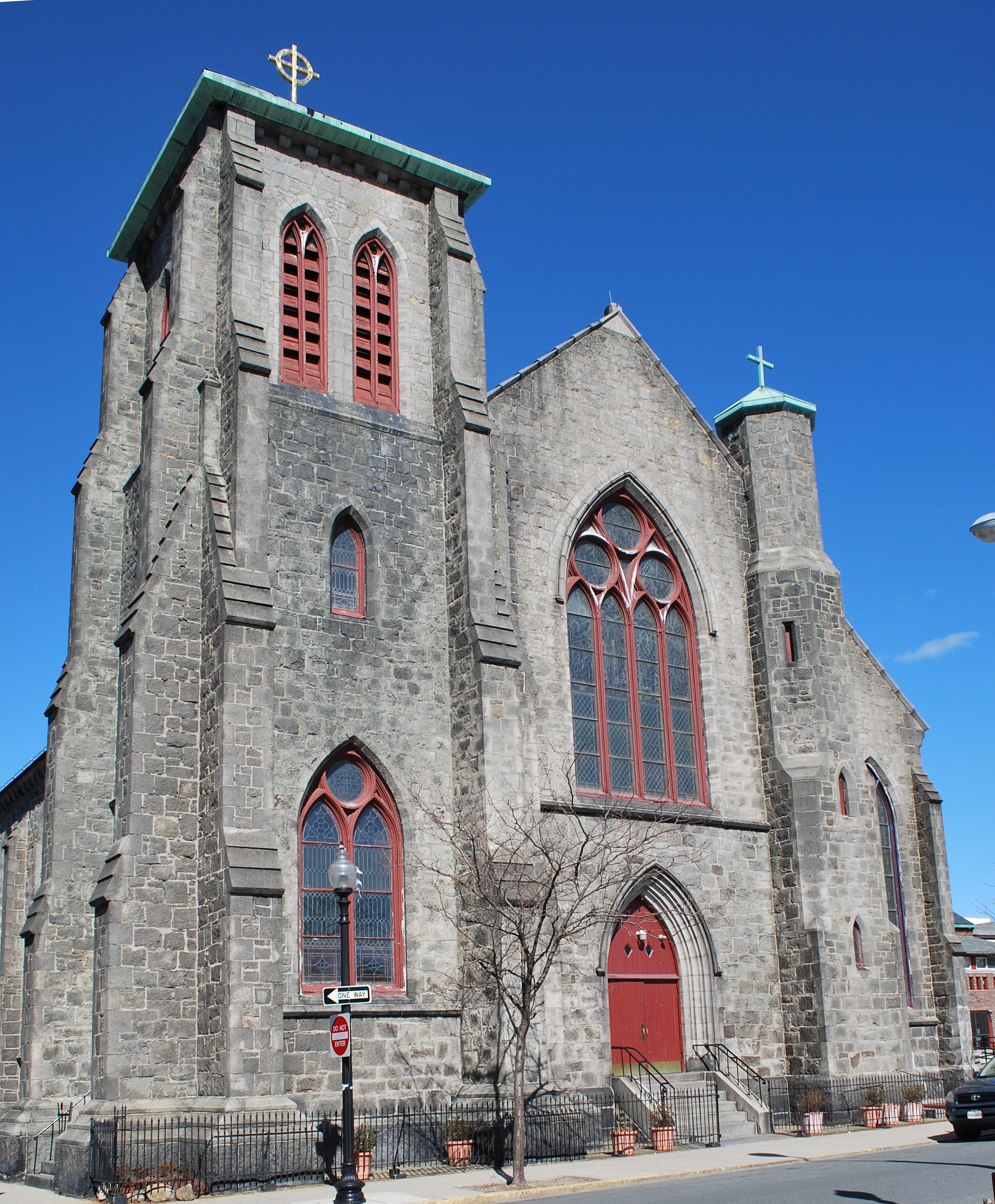
Most Holy Redeemer Church in East Boston

- Maverick Congregational Church – Formerly named the First Congregational Church; East Boston's first place of worship.
- Church of the Most Holy Redeemer – The first Roman Catholic church in East Boston.
- Our Lady of the Assumption Church
- Saratoga Street Methodist Episcopal Church – As of 2022, the church's location is the Central Park Lanes Bowling Center.
- First Presbyterian Church – In 1996, the church closed down but since the 2000s two other congregations gather there; Iglesias del Dios Vivo and La Luz del Mundo.
- Church of the Sacred Heart
- Maverick Congregational Church
- St. John's Episcopal Church – Wallis Howe from Martin and Hall Architects built the church in 1903 and since the 2000s, the East Boston APAC Headstart has operated there.
- Church of Our Father – Organized in 1845, this was the only Unitarian church in the neighborhood. In 1900, the church was sold and moved; the East Boston Post Office is located in the former building.
- Temple Ohel Jaocob – Founded in 1893 as the first place of worship for the Jewish community, this was the neighborhood's oldest and longest synagogue.
- Church of St. Mary Star
- Our Lady of Mount Carmel – Italian immigrants built the church in 1907, and in 2004 the Archdiocese of Boston closed the church.

Church at the Well - meeting inside The Well Coffee House on Border st.

=== Historic ===
==== Businesses ====
- Santarpio's Pizza – one of the original pizzerias that catered to Italian Americans who had emigrated to East Boston and the surrounding neighborhoods.

==== Neighborhoods ====
- Central Square
- Day Square
- Eagle Hill
- Maverick Square
- Orient Heights

==== Places ====
East Boston has eight places on the National Register of Historic Places:

- Baker Congregational Church
- Barnes School
- Bennington Street Burying Ground
- Eagle Hill Historic District
- Donald McKay House
- United States lightship Nantucket (LV-112)
- Temple Ohabei Shalom Cemetery
- Trinity Neighborhood House
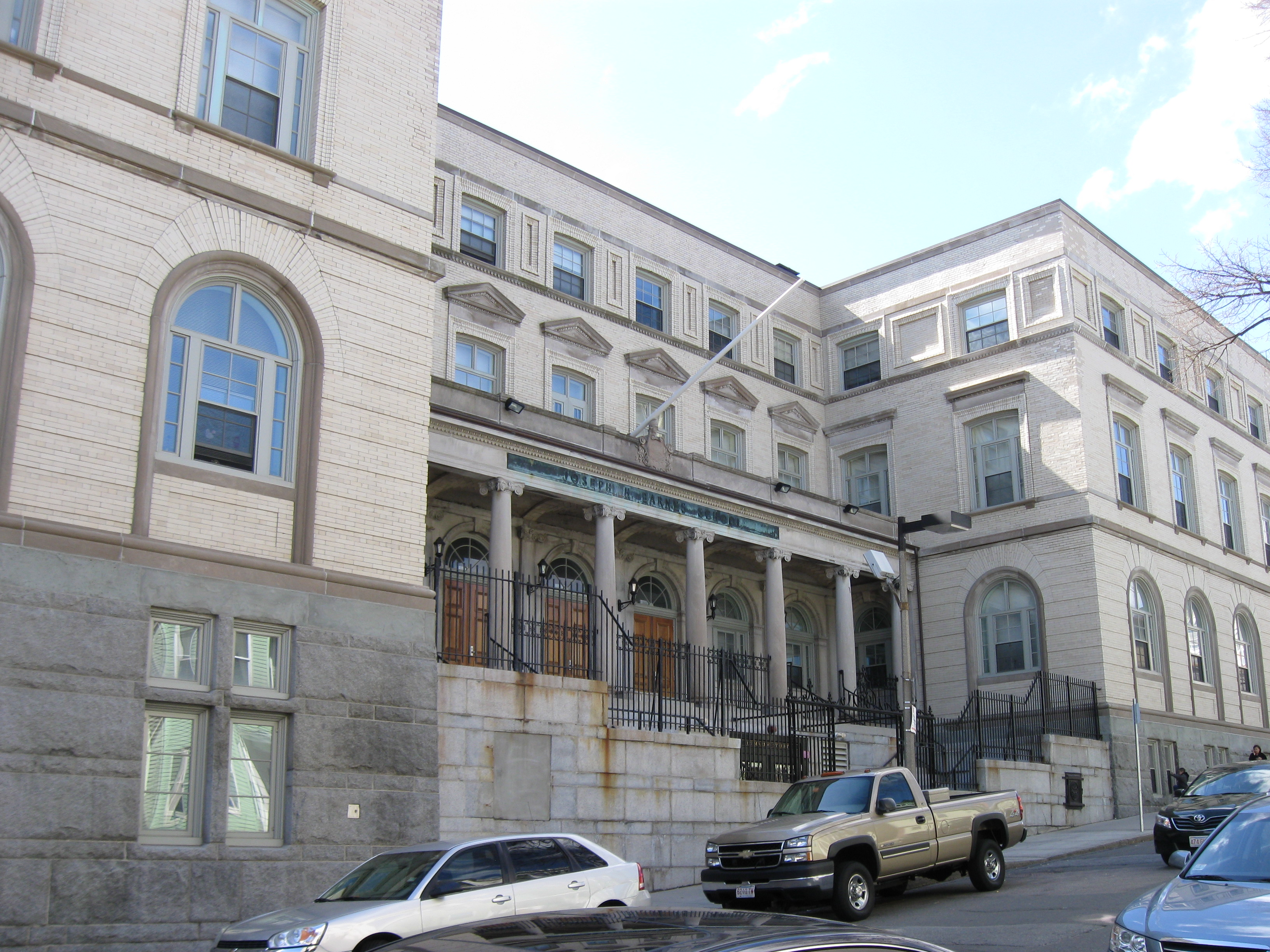
Barnes School

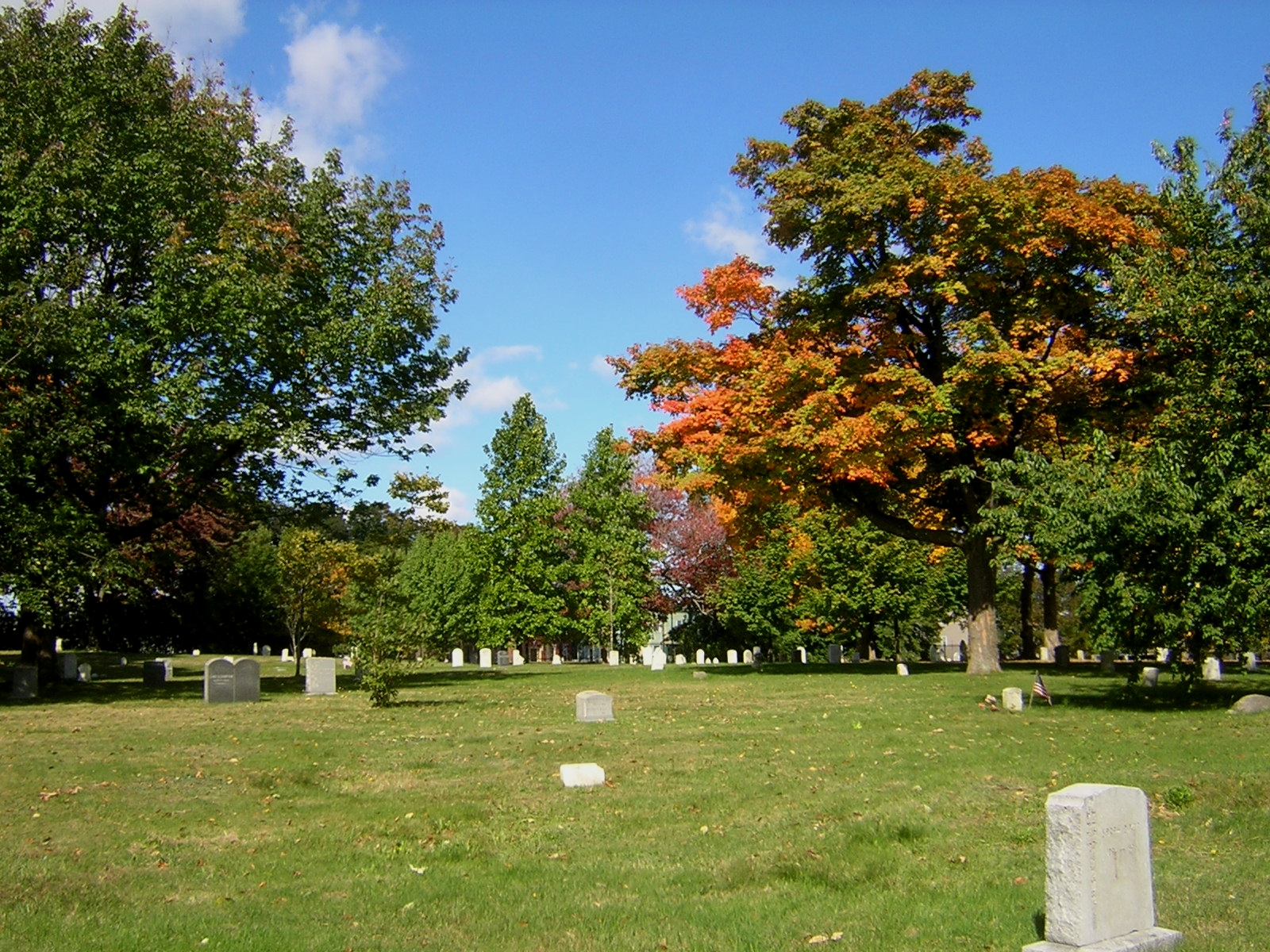
Bennington Street Burying Ground

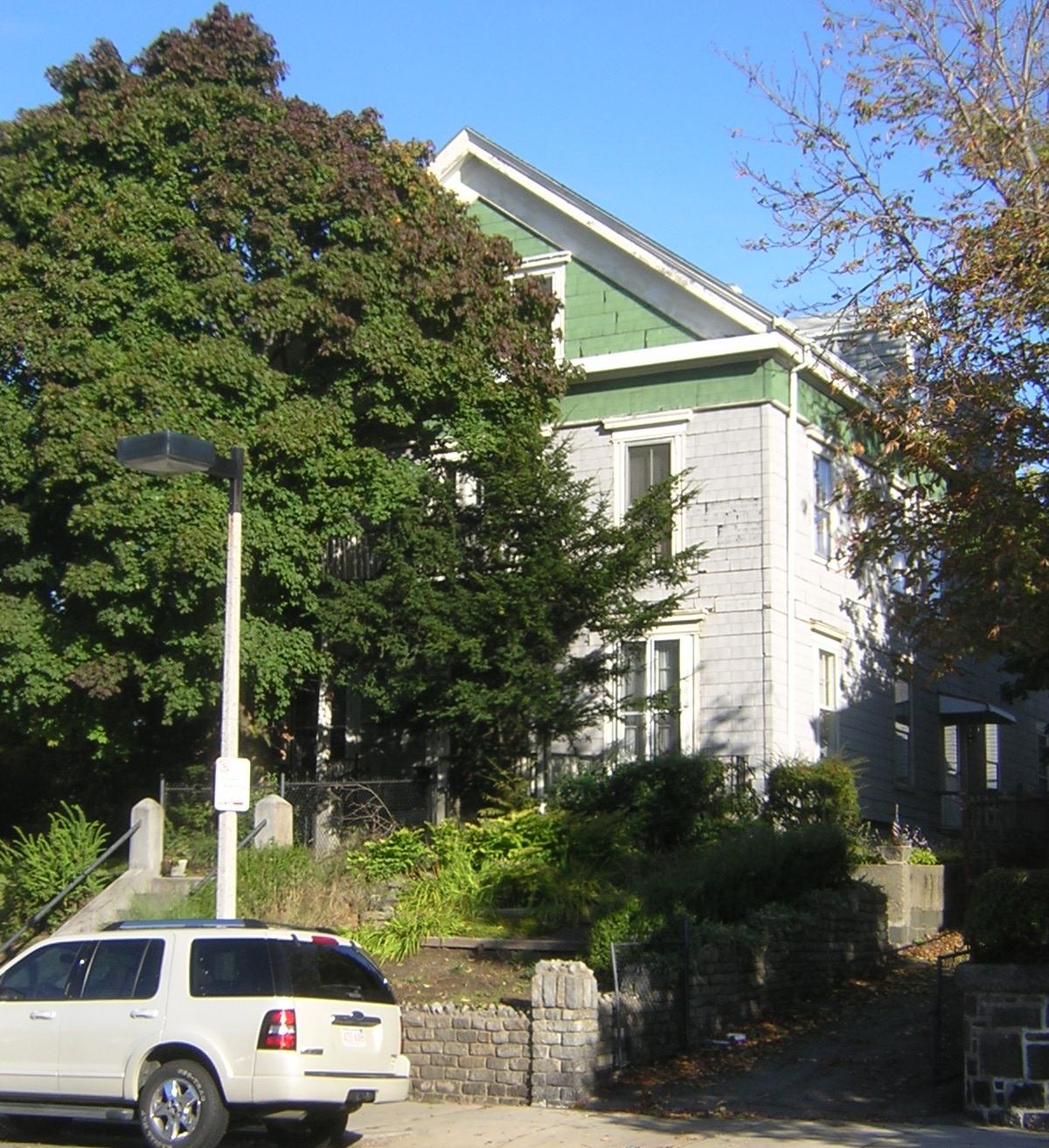
Donald McKay House

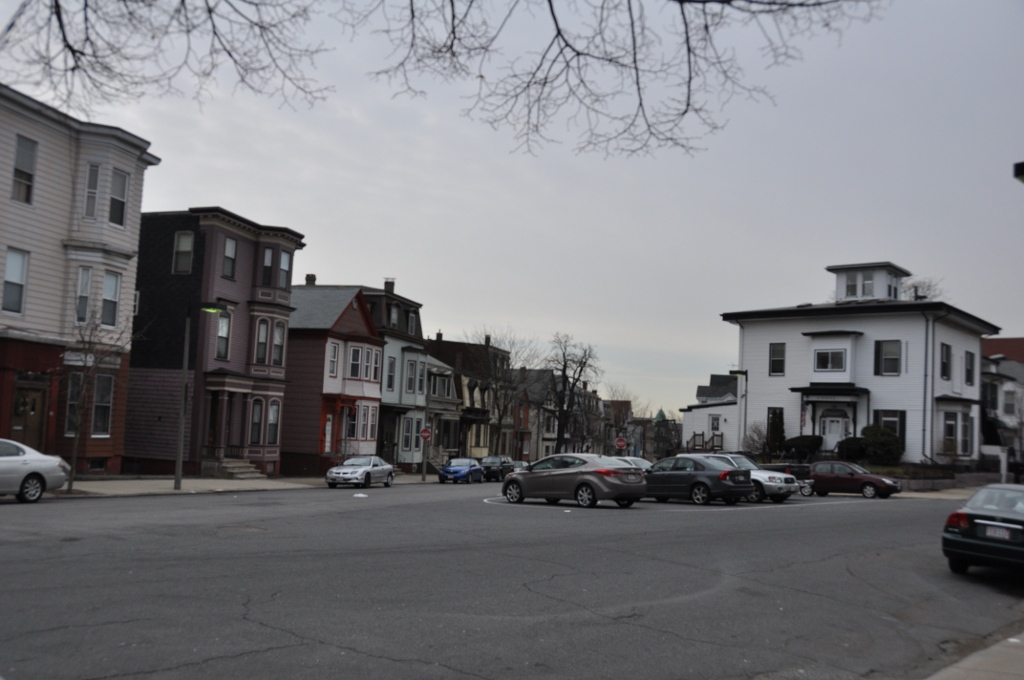
Eagle Hill Historic District

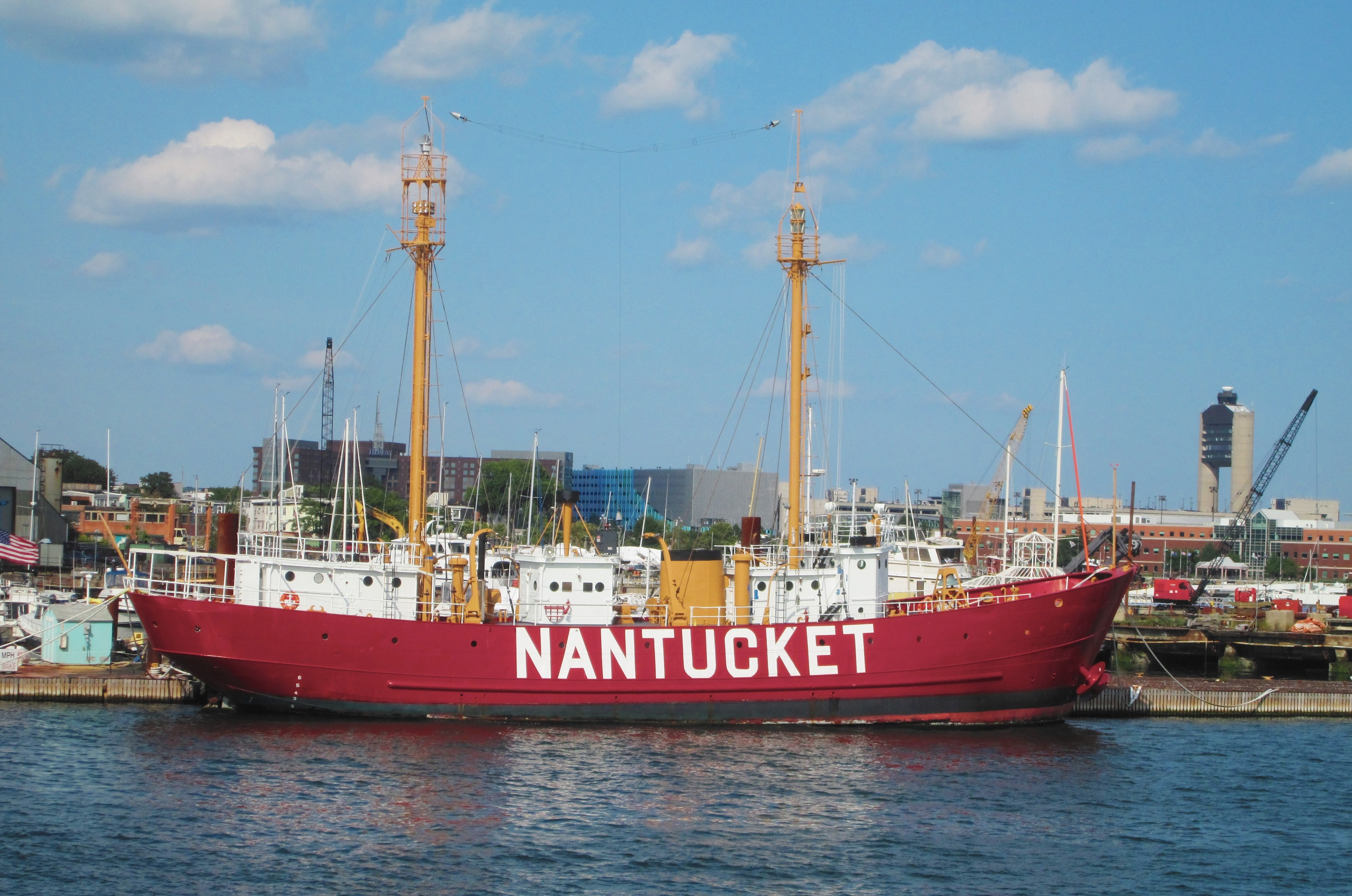
United States lightship Nantucket (LV-112)

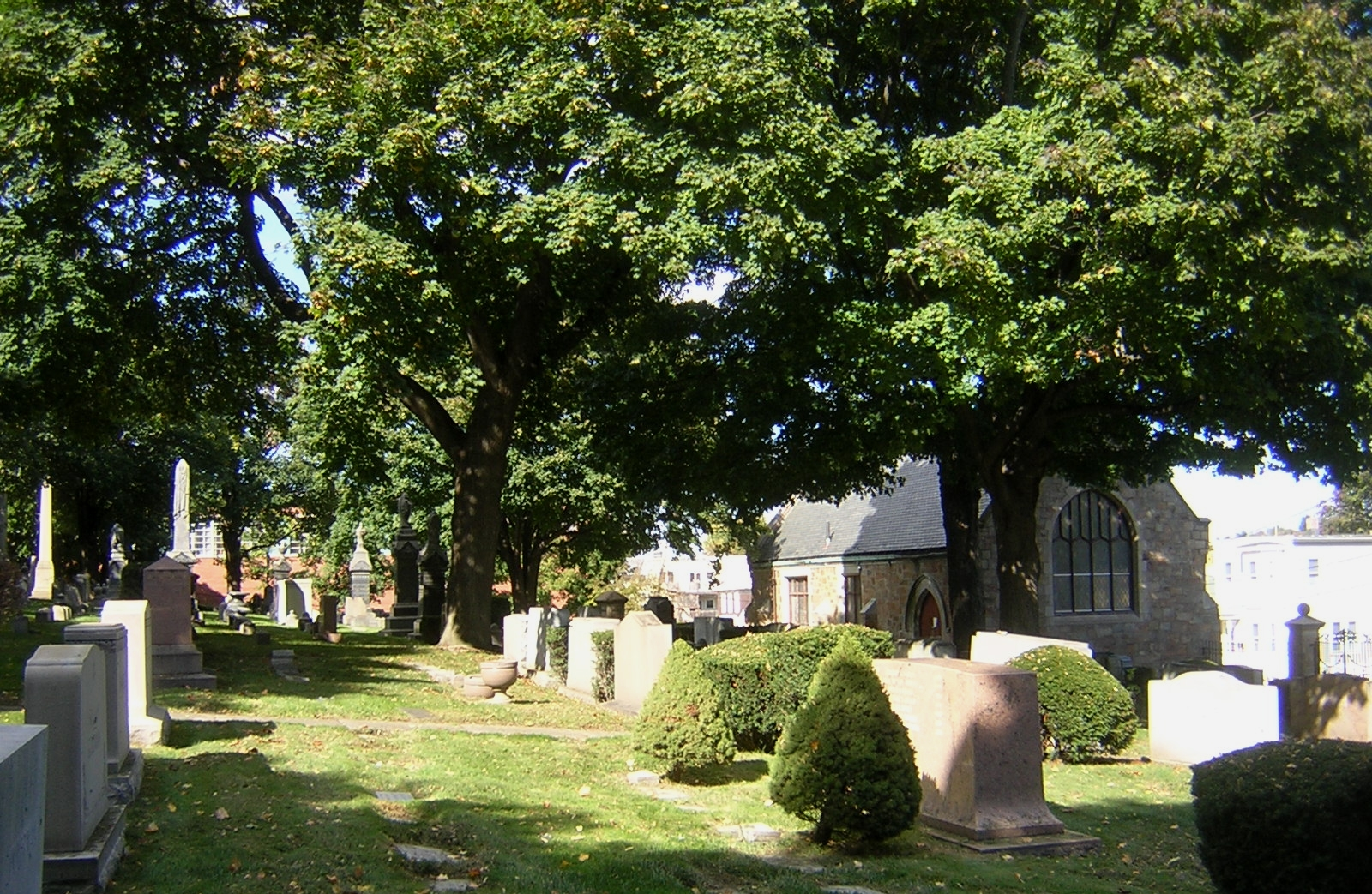
Temple Ohabei Shalom Cemetery

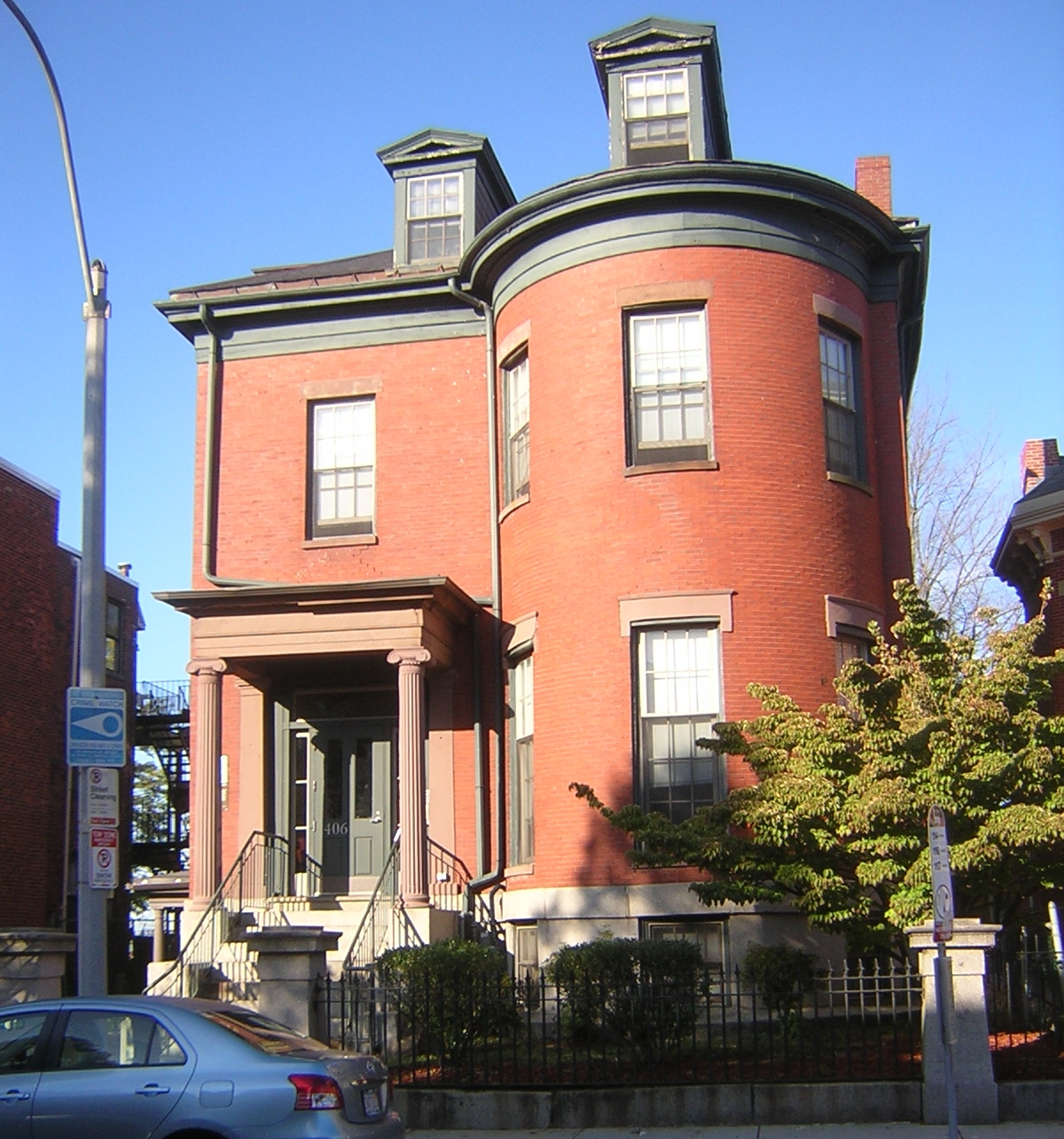
Trinity Neighborhood House

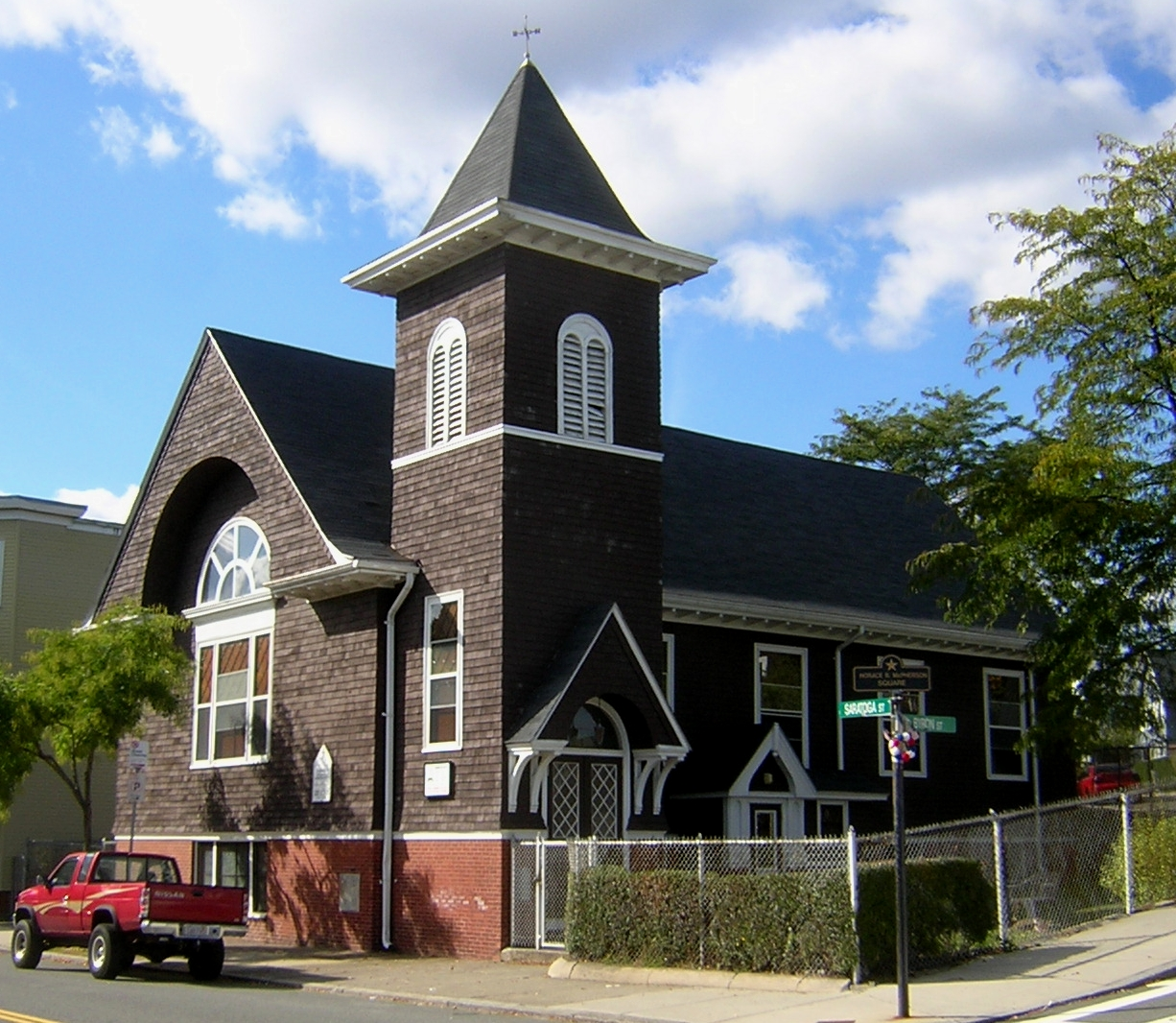
Baker Congregational Church

=== Sports arenas and stadiums ===
- Suffolk Downs – defunct as of 2017
- East Boston Memorial Stadium – Since 2015, Suffolk University has used the stadium for their baseball, soccer, and softball teams to practice and play games. The stadium belongs to the City of Boston and serves multiple purposes for the community. East Boston High School also utilizes the stadium annually to hold their graduation ceremony.

== Government and neighborhood ==
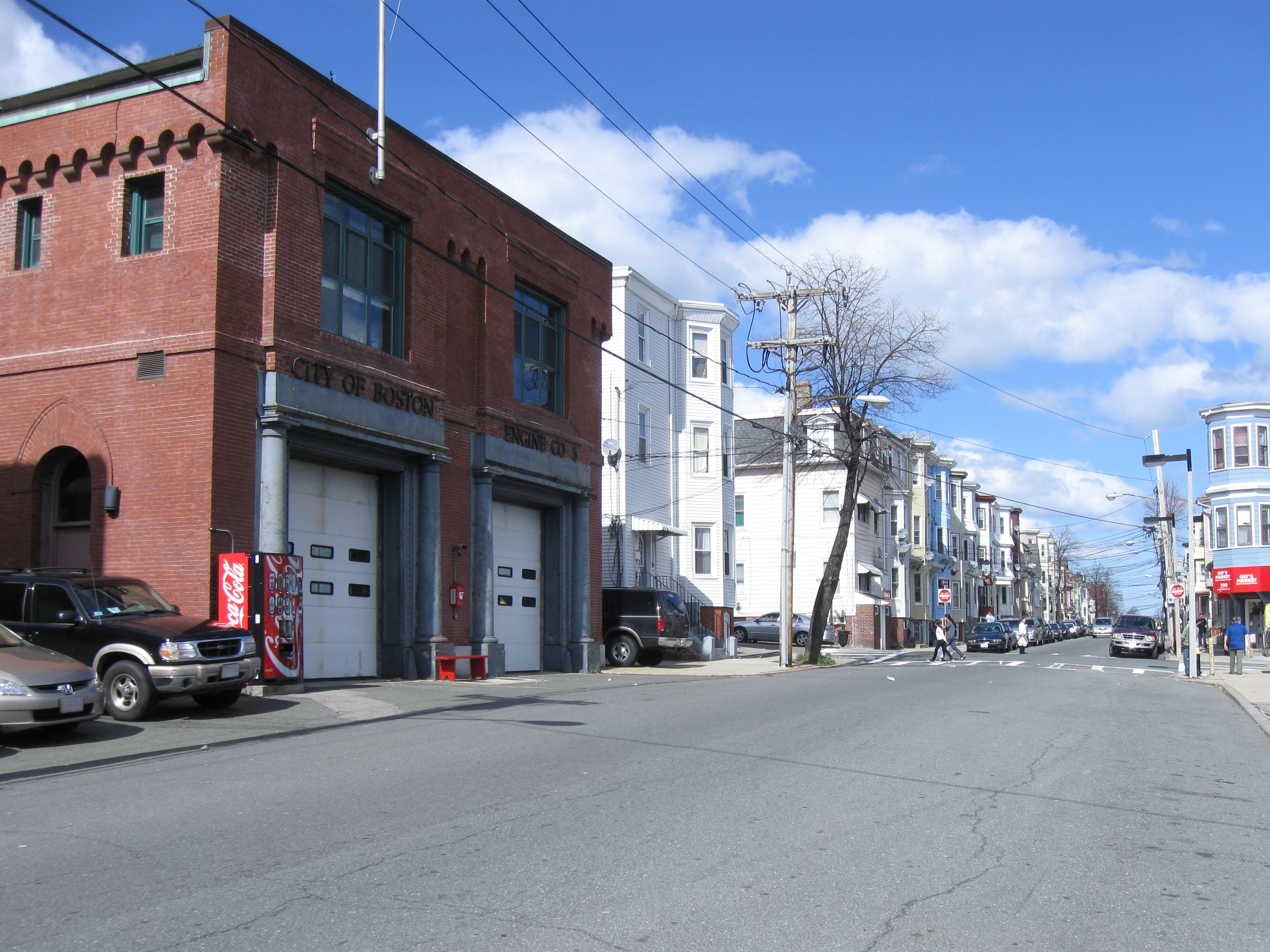
Boston Fire Department Engine 5 on Saratoga Street

East Boston is the headquarters for District A-7 of the Boston Police Department. The Boston Fire Department has three fire stations in East Boston: Ladder 2 & Engine 9 in Maverick Square; Engine 5 in Day Square; and Ladder 21 & Engine 56 in Orient Heights. Boston EMS's Station 7 is based at Logan Airport, but provides emergency medical services to all of East Boston. The United States Postal Service operates a branch in East Boston at 50 Meridian Street. The Logan Office Center, which contains the headquarters of the Massachusetts Port Authority, is adjacent to Logan Airport.

As of the 2022 election cycle, East Boston's local elected officials include State Representative Adrian Madaro representing the First Suffolk, State Senator Lydia Edwards representing the First Suffolk and Middlesex, and City Councilor Gabriela "Gigi" Coletta, who represents District 1 of Boston.

=== Historic demographics ===
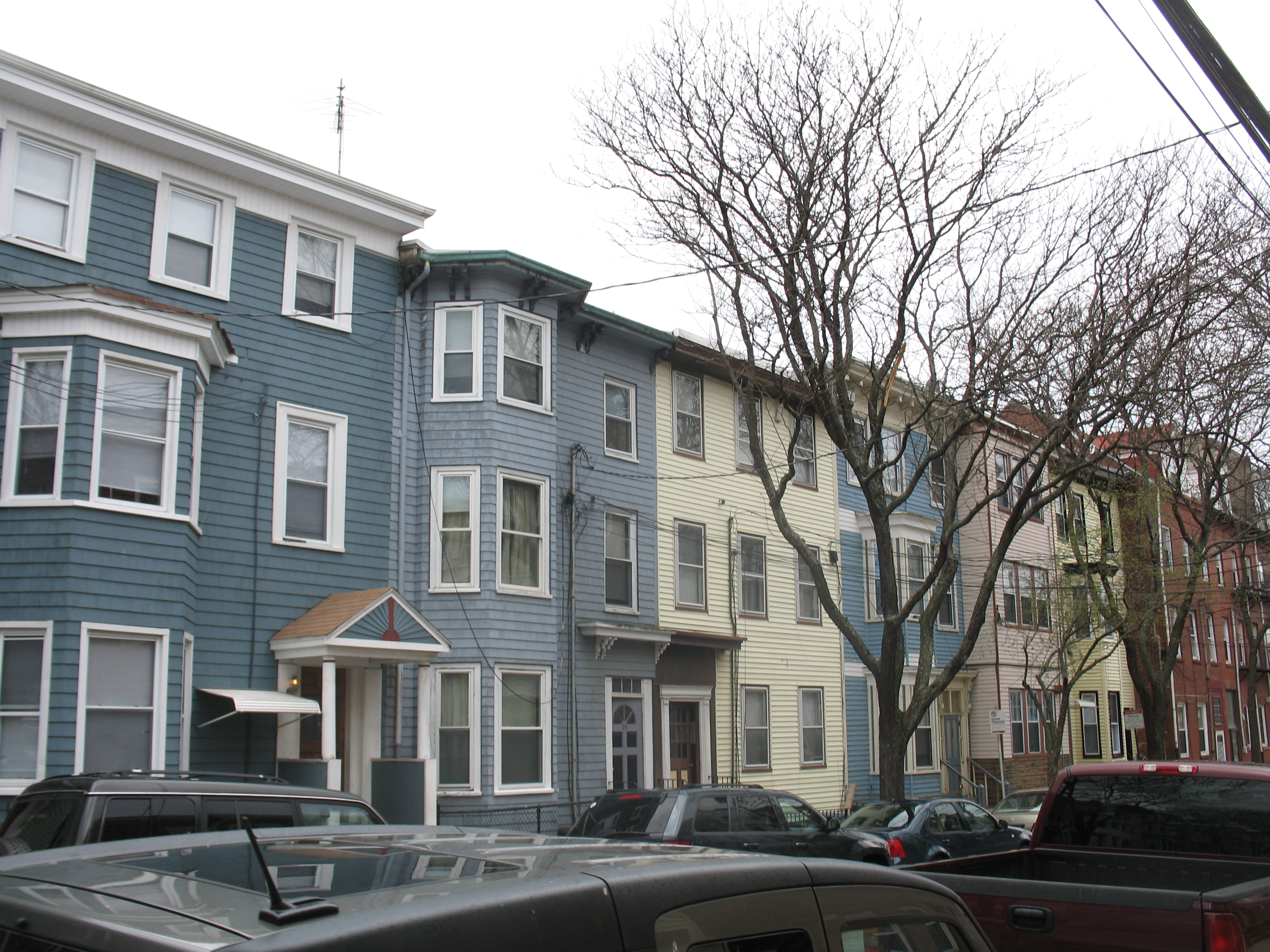
Residences on Cottage Street

East Boston's population is ethnically diverse, reflecting the immigrants from around the world who moved there. Since the early 1900s, immigrants have been a part of the East Boston community. First Irish and Canadians, then Russian Jews and Italians, Southeast Asians, and finally Latinos. In 2011, East Boston was estimated to have 41,128 residents living in 14,832 housing units.

Hispanic/Latino people speaking Spanish or Portuguese are the largest language groupings (can be of any race and from more than 20 countries), making up 54.4% of the population, followed by non-Hispanic white (35.5%). Other races include Asian (4.4%), black or African American (2.9%), biracial or multiracial individuals (1.9%), and other races (0.9%). The median household income for an individual in East Boston was $45,849, while the median income for a family was $47,198.

According to 2020 Census data, analyzed by the Boston Planning & Development Agency, East Boston shared the highest population of Hispanic or Latinos in Boston with 50.4% of the neighborhood. East Boston's total population is 43,066 with half of the population identifying as Hispanic or Latino and the second largest demographic group being White at 36.6%. The demographics for Hispanic or Latino decreased from 2010 when the group made up 52.9% of the population. In September 2022, Mayor Michelle Wu questioned the 2020 Census data for the whole city, sharing concerns over uncounted individuals, citing the pandemic as a factor for low census turnout, and expressing her belief that Boston's total numbers needed to be adjusted higher.

East Boston Demographic Population Based on 2010 and 2020 Census Data
Total Population	2010		2020	
	Count	Share	Count	Share
Total	40,508		43,066	
White Alone	15,051	37.2%	15,760	36.6%
Black or African American Alone	1,283	3.2%	1,403	3.3%
Hispanic or Latino	21,419	52.9%	21,700	50.4%
Asian or Pacific Islander Alone	1,413	3.5%	1,932	4.5%
Other Races or Multiple Races	1,342	3.3%	2,271	5.3%

=== Race and ancestry ===
East Boston (02128) Racial Breakdown of Population (2017)
Race	Percentage of 02128 population	Percentage of Massachusetts population	Percentage of United States population	ZIP Code-to-State Difference	ZIP Code-to-USA Difference
White	62.5%	81.3%	76.6%	–18.8%	–14.1%
Hispanic	57.7%	11.9%	18.1%	+45.8%	+39.6%
White (Non-Hispanic)	32.0%	72.1%	60.7%	–40.1%	–28.7%
Asian	3.5%	6.9%	5.8%	–3.4%	–2.3%
Black	2.9%	8.8%	13.4%	–5.9%	–10.5%
Native Americans/Hawaiians	1.0%	0.6%	1.5%	+0.4%	–0.5%
Two or more races	26.8%	2.4%	2.7%	+24.4%	+24.1%

According to the 2012-2016 American Community Survey 5-Year Estimates, the largest ancestry groups in ZIP Code 02128 are:

Ancestry	Percentage of 02128 population	Percentage of Massachusetts population	Percentage of United States population	ZIP Code-to-State Difference	ZIP Code-to-USA Difference
Italian	13.03%	13.19%	5.39%	–0.15%	+7.64%
Irish	7.29%	21.16%	10.39%	–13.87%	–3.10%
Mexican	3.83%	0.67%	11.96%	+3.16%	–8.13%
Puerto Rican	3.06%	4.52%	1.66%	–1.46%	+1.40%
Brazilian	2.49%	1.03%	0.12%	+1.46%	+2.37%
Arab	2.27%	1.10%	0.59%	+1.17%	+1.68%
American	2.26%	4.26%	6.89%	–2.00%	–4.63%
English	2.06%	9.77%	7.67%	–7.71%	–5.61%
Chinese	1.79%	2.28%	1.24%	–0.49%	+0.55%
German	1.41%	6.00%	14.40%	–4.60%	–13.00%
Polish	1.15%	4.67%	2.93%	–3.52%	–1.79%
Moroccan	1.12%	0.12%	0.03%	+1.00%	+1.09%

=== Education ===
==== Public schools ====
Boston Public Schools operates numerous schools in East Boston. BPS assigns students based on student preference and priorities of students in various zones. Due to the geography of East Boston, every child in the neighborhood is guaranteed a seat at a school in East Boston. The district instructs parents wanting to send their children to East Boston schools to place East Boston campuses on their school assignment priority lists higher than non-neighborhood campus.

The East Boston Early Childhood Center is a district K0–1 school in East Boston. The Dante Alighieri Montessori School is a district K0-6 school. District elementary schools include Samuel Adams, Manassah E. Bradley, Curtis Guild, Patrick J. Kennedy, Hugh R. O'Donnell, and James Otis. The Mario Umana Academy and Donald McKay K-8 School are the two district K–8 schools in East Boston. East Boston has two high schools in their district; East Boston High School and Excel Academy Charter High School, which was founded in 2015. Excel Academy Charter School also has two charter middle schools located on Moore St. and Bremen St. in East Boston.

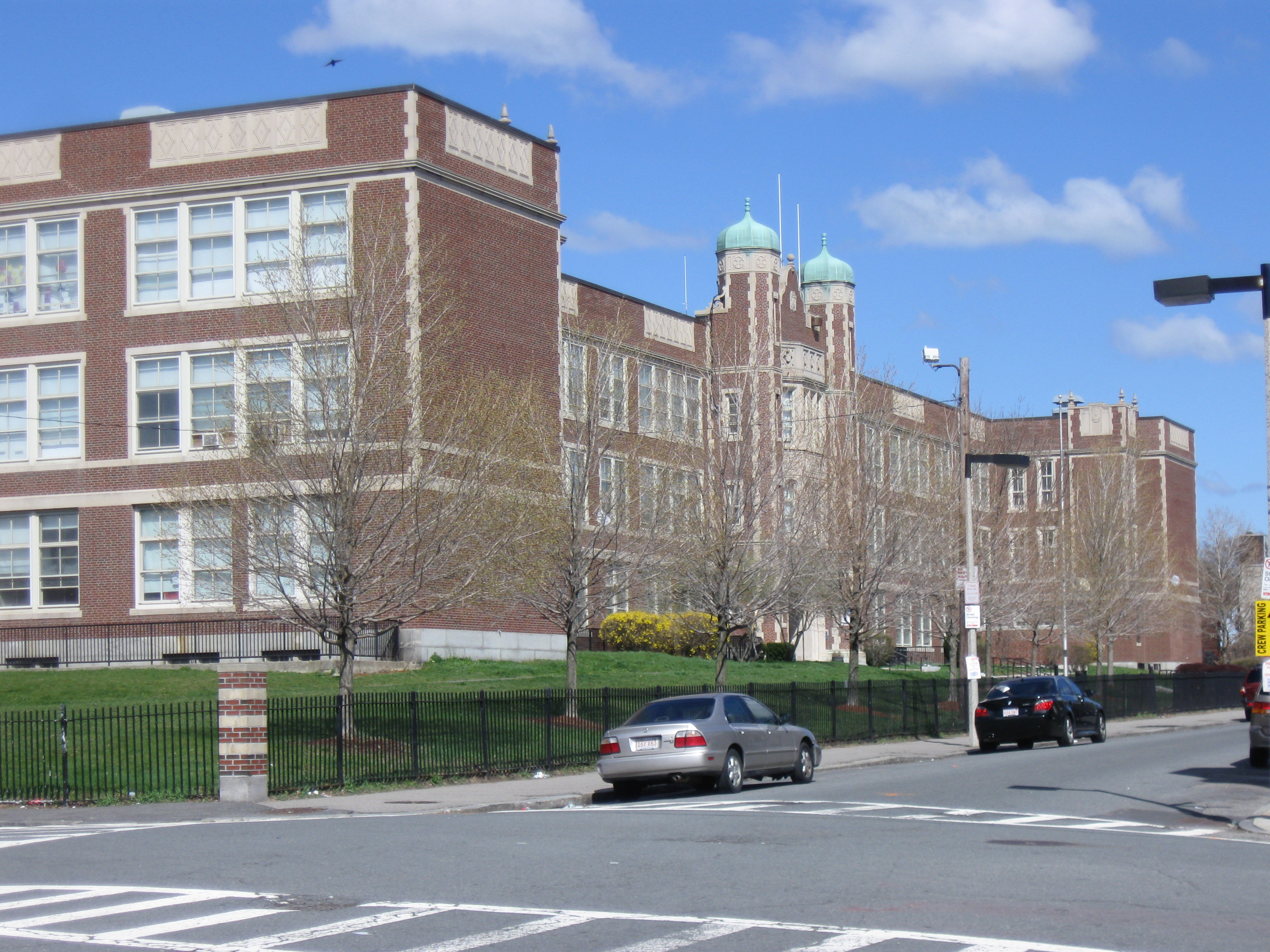
East Boston High School

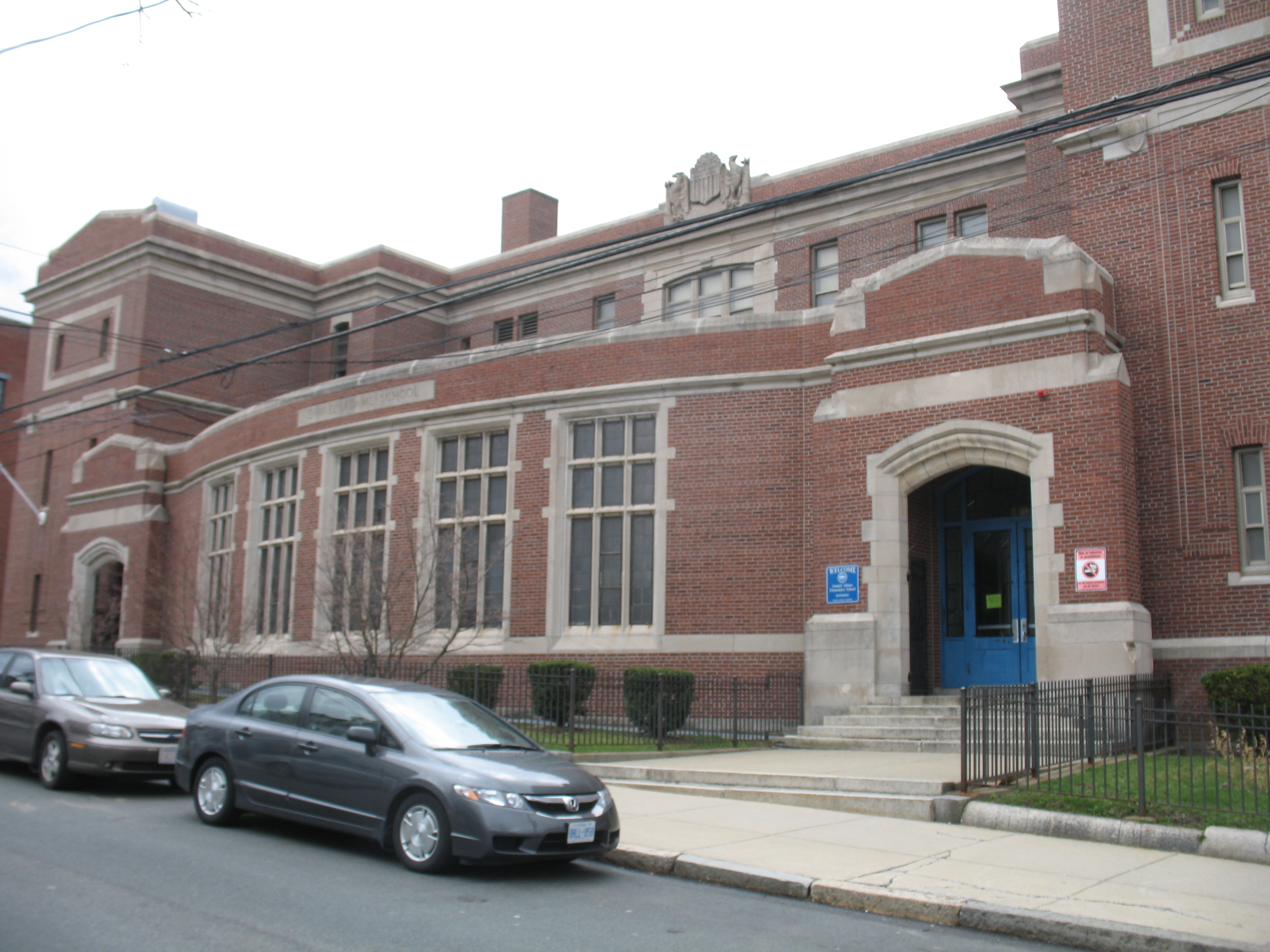
Samuel Adams Elementary School

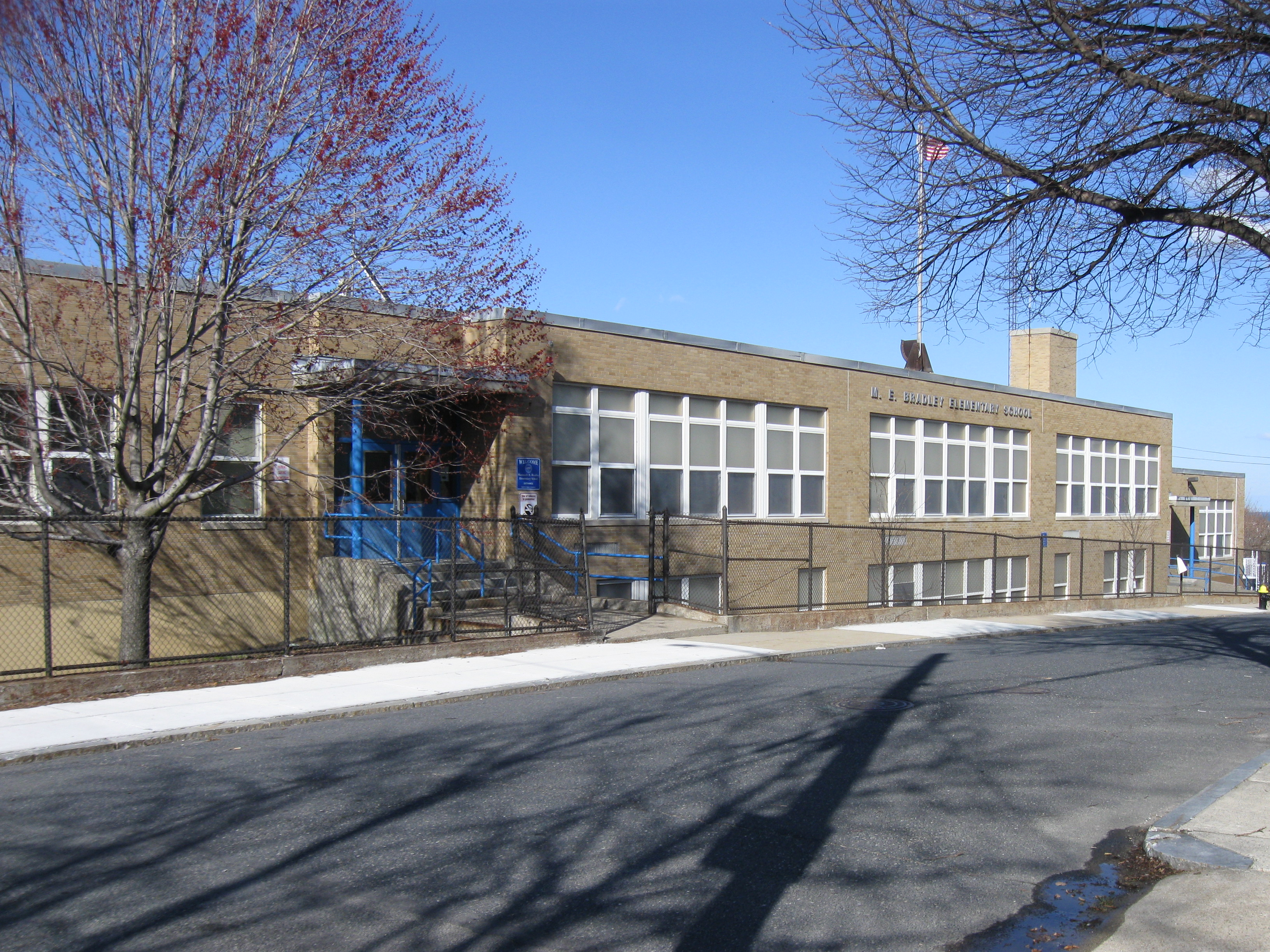
Manassah E. Bradley Elementary School

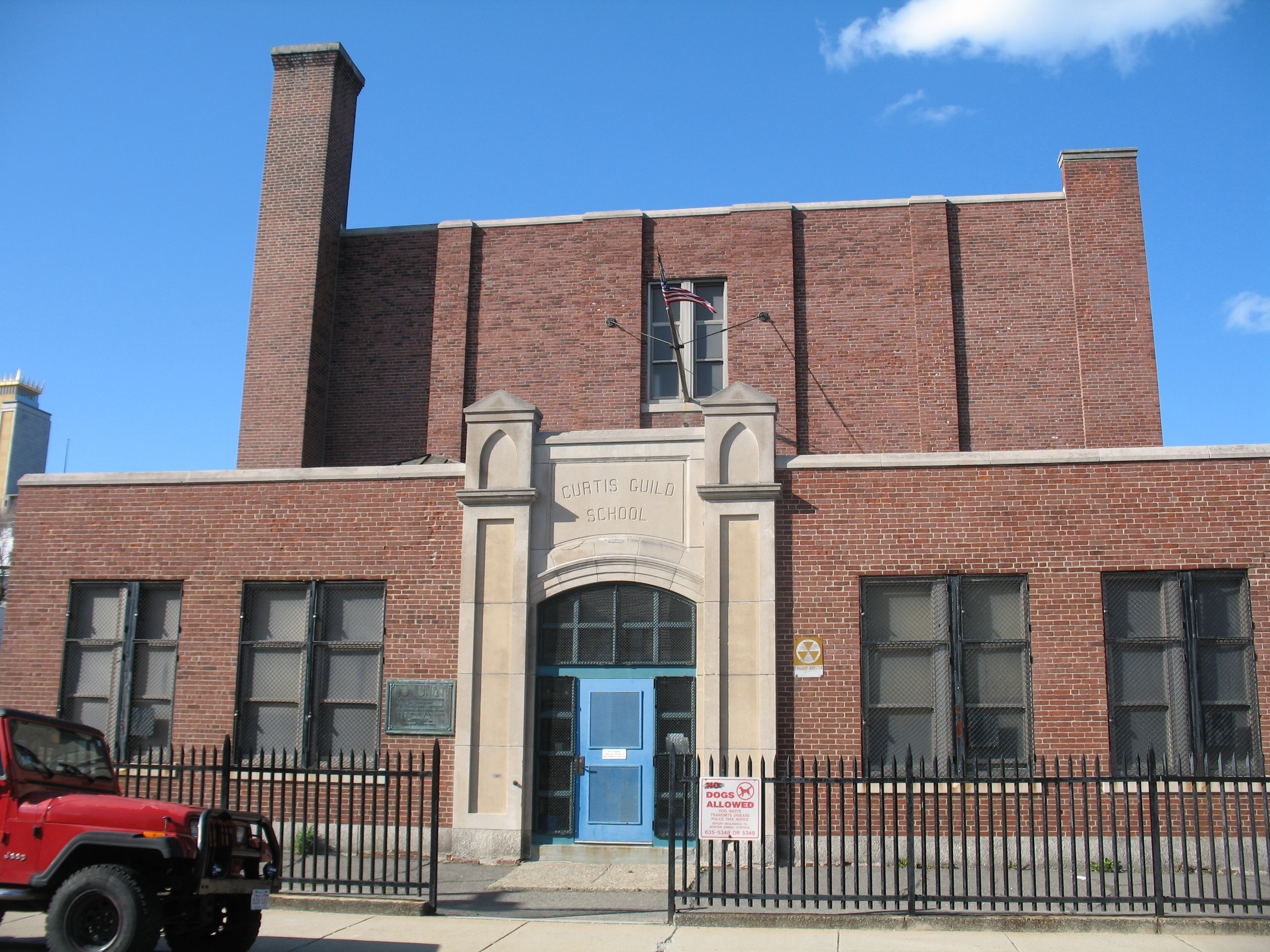
Curtis Guild Elementary School

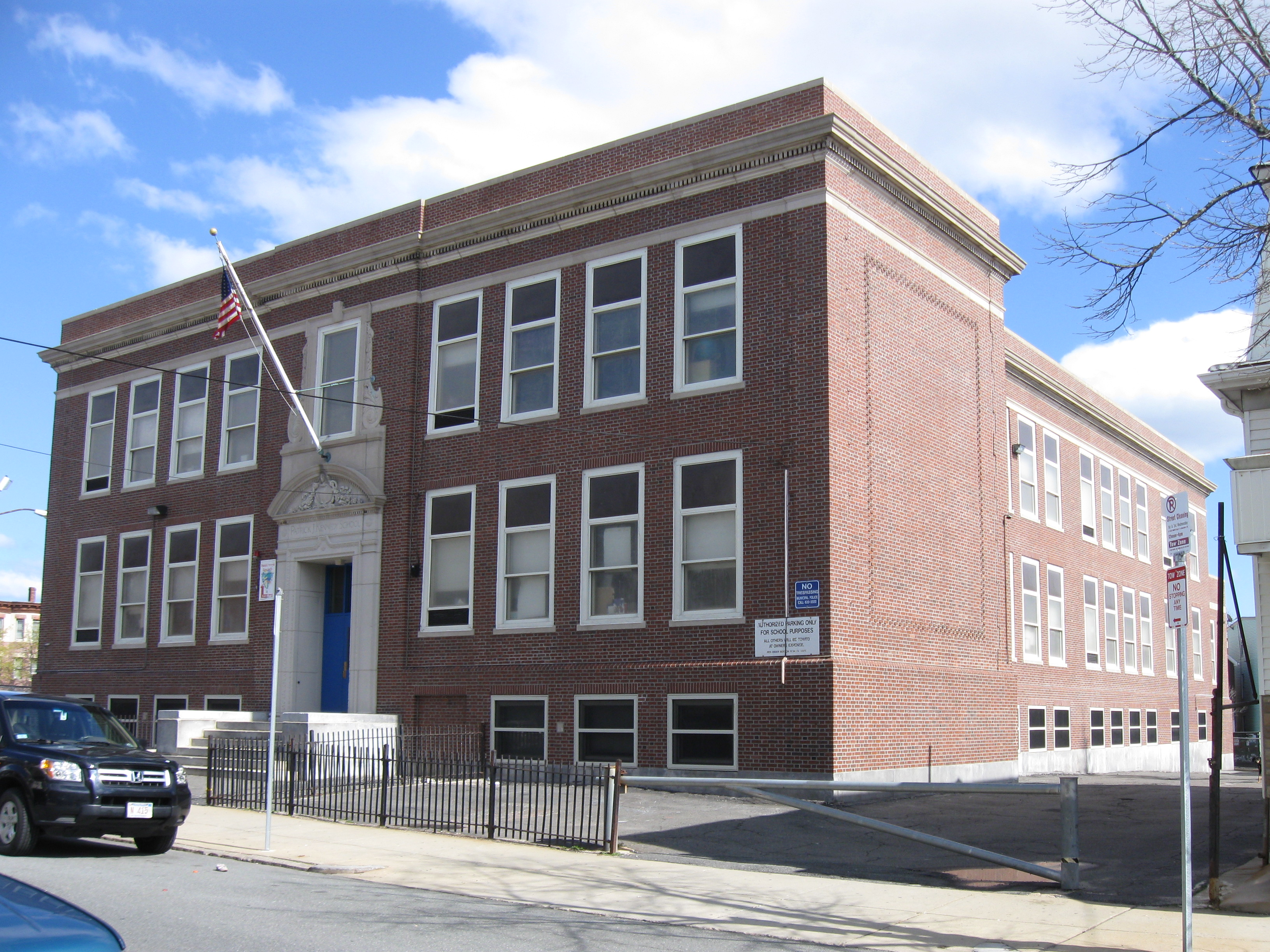
Patrick J. Kennedy Elementary School

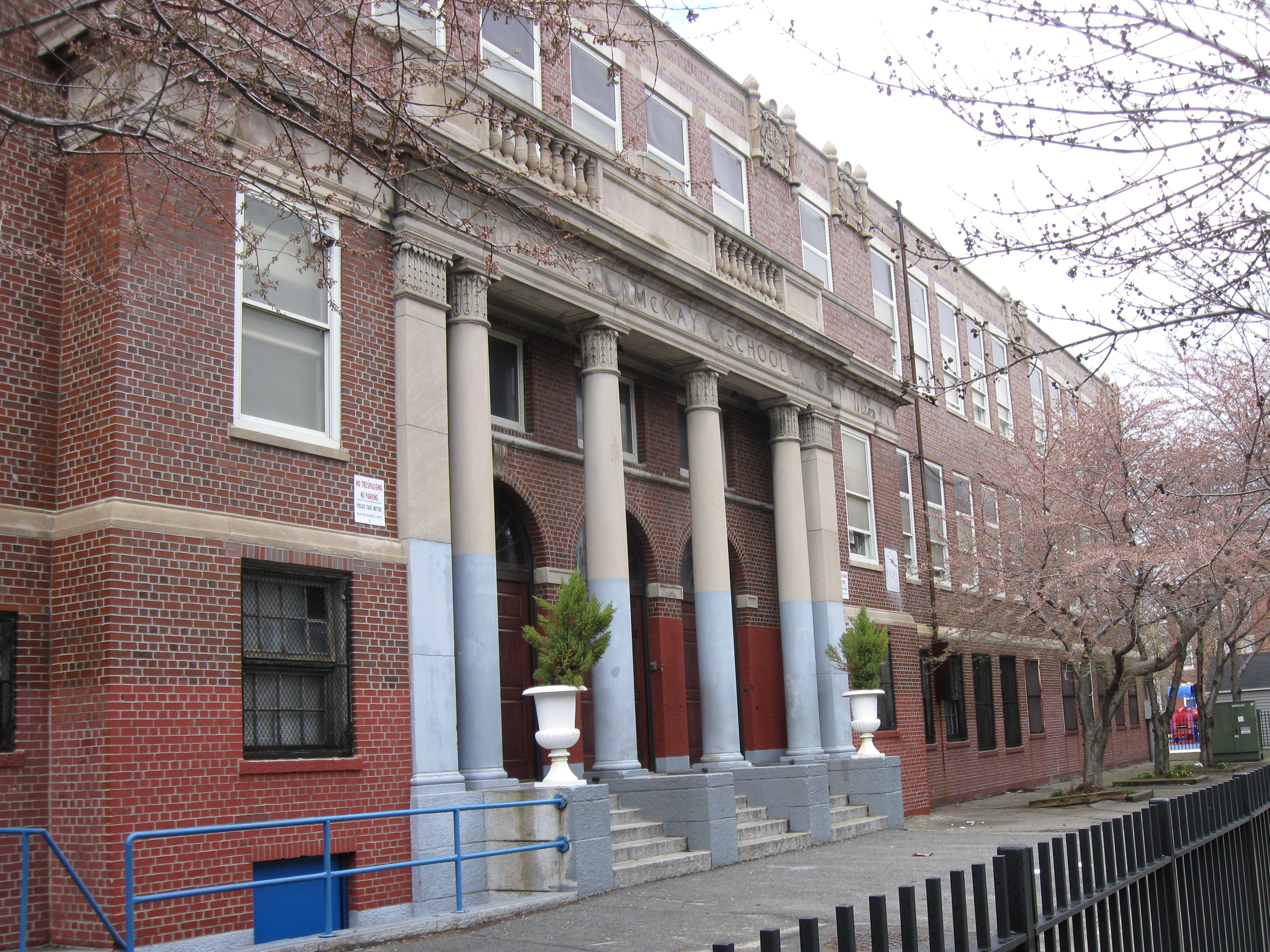
Donald McKay K-8 School

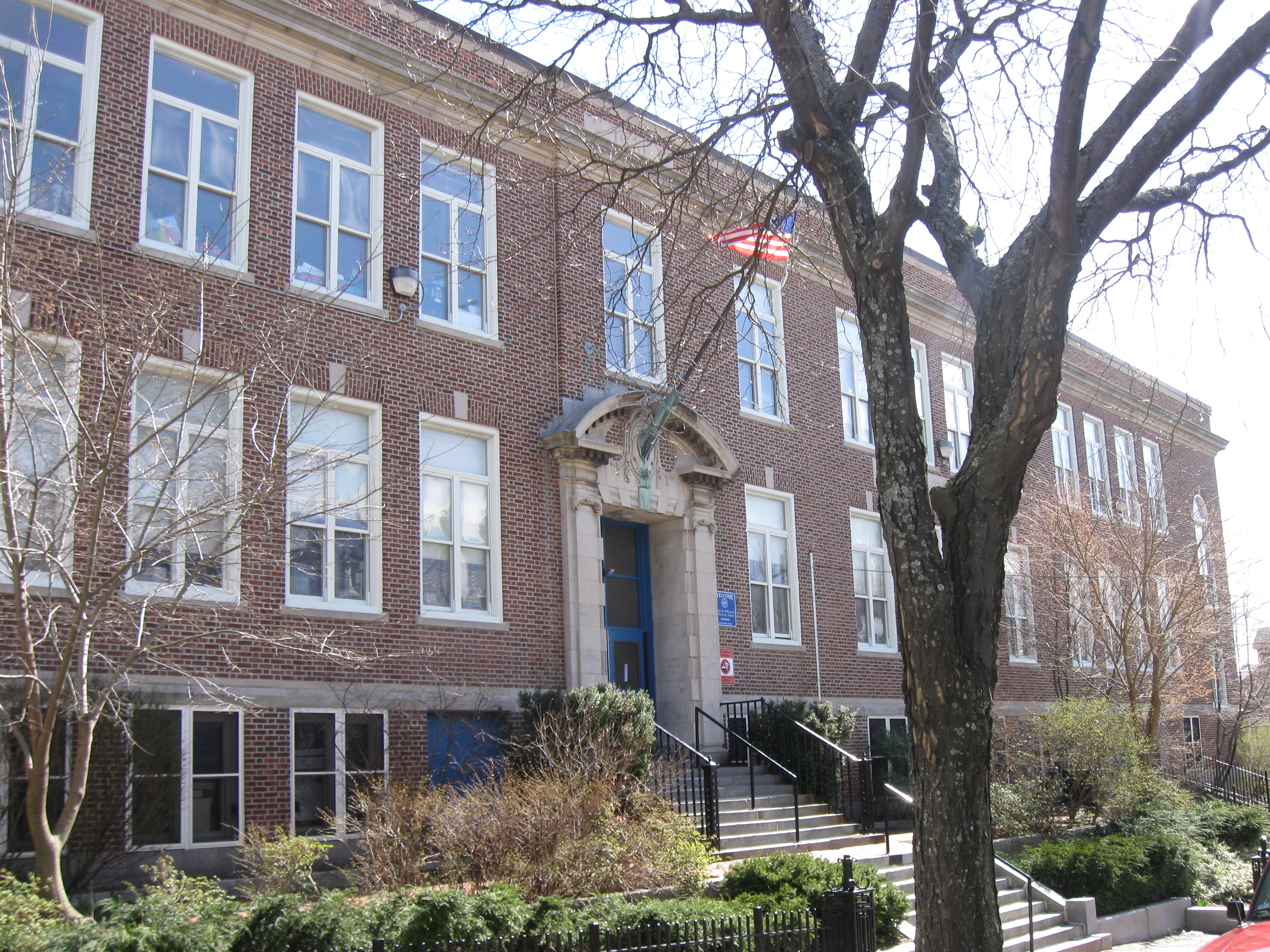
Hugh R. O'Donnell Elementary School

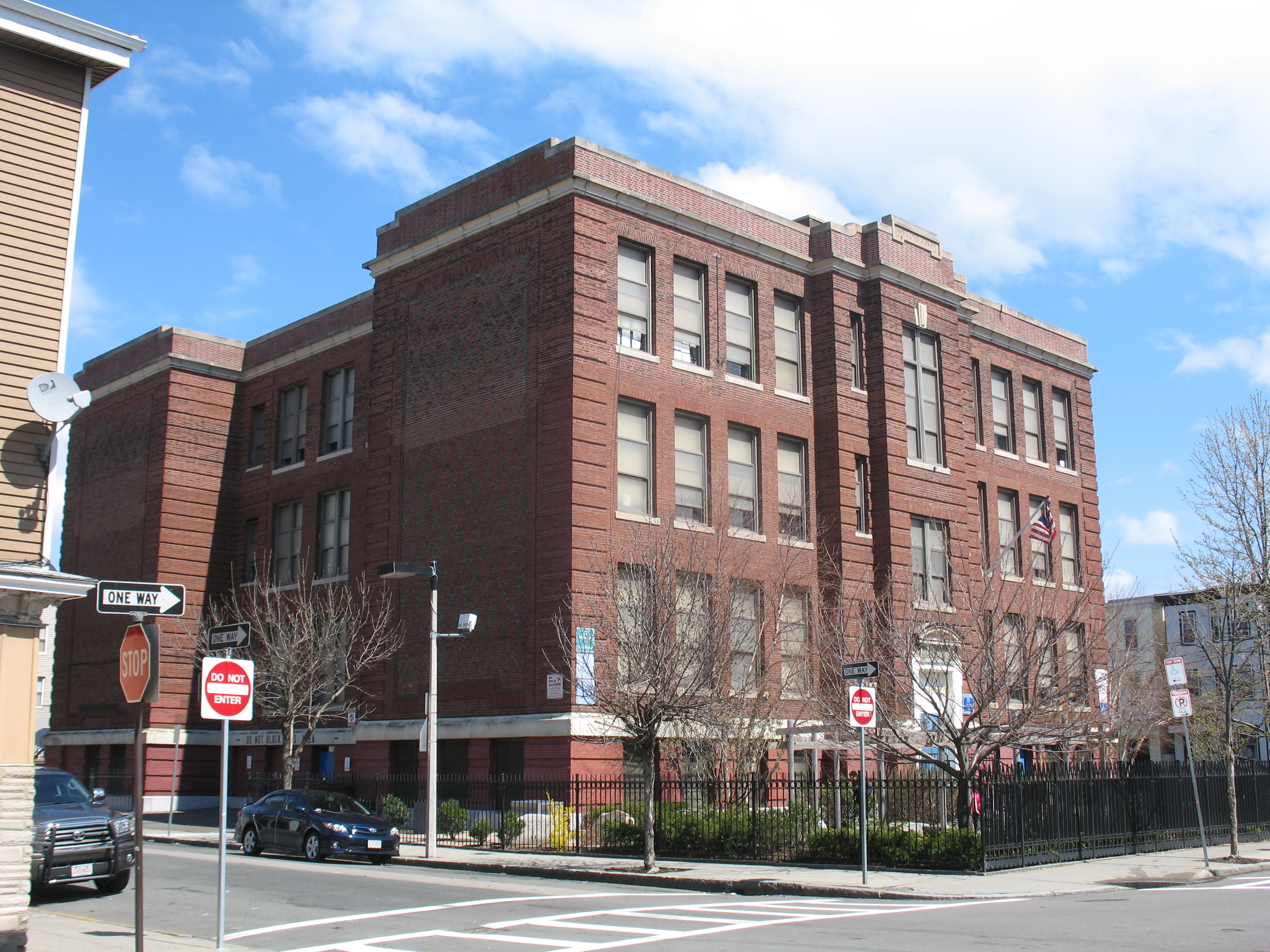
James Otis Elementary School

===== Private schools =====
In spring 1892, a school named after Fr. James Fitton was dedicated on the Holy Redeemer site. In 1974, a school merger occurred, producing the current East Boston Central Catholic School. The Roman Catholic Archdiocese of Boston operates East Boston Central Catholic School on the Most Holy Redeemer Parish site. It is a K1–8 private school in East Boston. The school is managed by a board from the Our Lady of the Assumption, Our Lady of Mount Carmel, Most Holy Redeemer and Sacred Heart parishes.

In Spring 2008, the Archdiocese ordered the closure of St. Mary, Star of the Sea School, a K–8 school in East Boston. The parish attached to the school had closed three years prior to the closure of the school.

Until it closed in 2007, Savio Preparatory High School was a private, coeducational high school in East Boston.

==== Public libraries ====
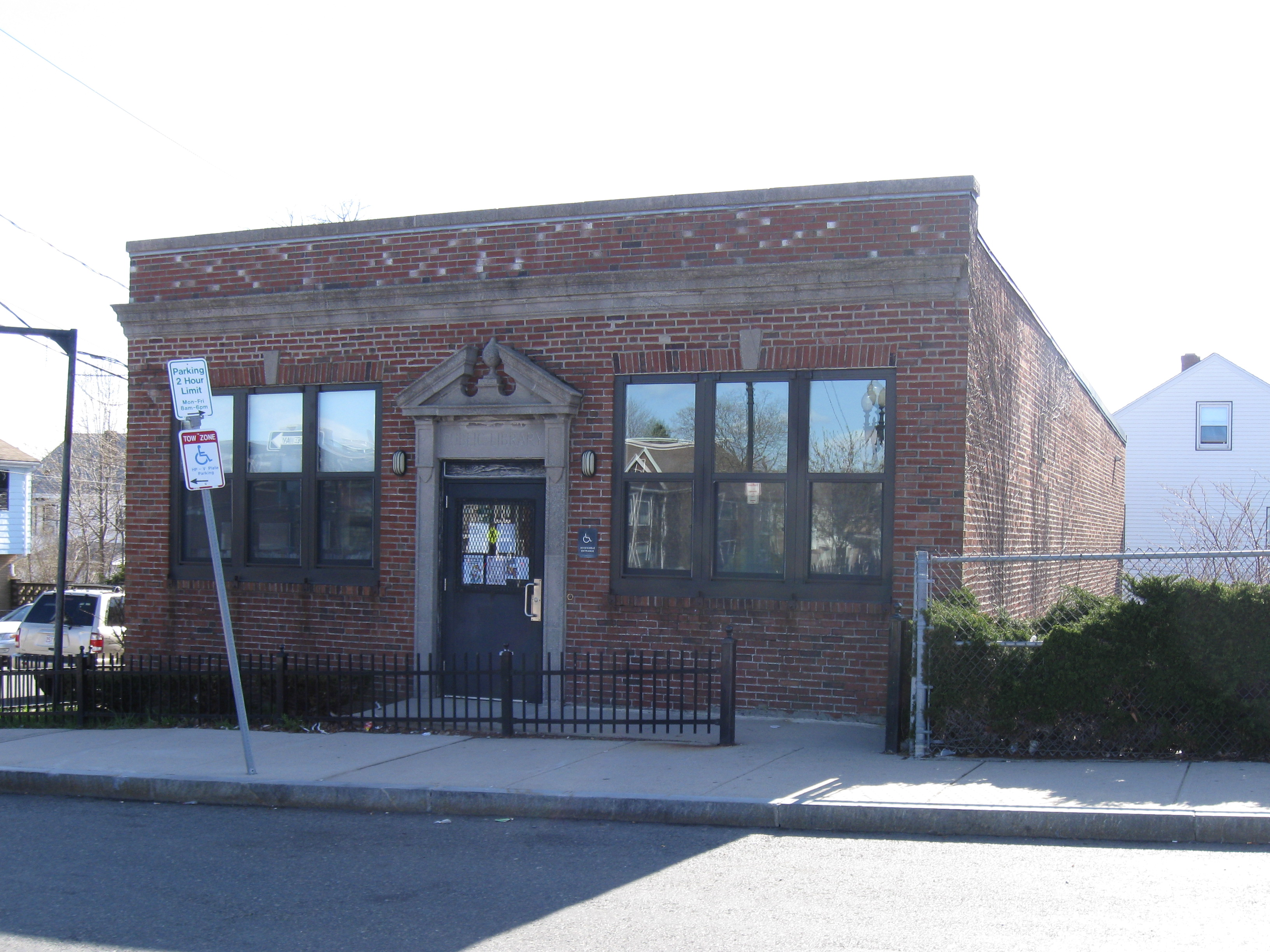
The former Orient Heights branch of the Boston Public Library

The first public branch library in the United States was established in East Boston in 1870. Boston Public Library currently has one location in East Boston, at 365 Bremen Street in the Bremen Street Park. This branch opened in November 2013. The old branches at 276 Meridian Street and 18 Barnes Avenue were closed in 2013, shortly before the current branch opened.

=== Community centers and resources ===
East Boston has various non-profits that work to address issues the community face like immigration, tenant's rights, youth engagement, environmental justice, housing, and more. Such organizations are Neighborhood of Affordable Housing (NOAH), East Boston Main Streets, East Boston Social Center, YMCA, Harbor Arts, Piers Park Sailing Center, and more.

The City of Boston runs two community centers in East Boston: Orient Heights Community Center (now called The Martin Pino Community Center) and Paris Street Community Center. These Centers are an initiative of a citywide organization called Boston Center for Youth and Families. The Centers aim to assist local youth with after-school programming.

=== Open space ===
In the early 1990s, East Boston had the least open space of any Boston neighborhood, except Chinatown. However, the city of Boston, and East Boston in particular, has undergone several major initiatives to increase open space in Boston. One such initiative is called Urban Wilds. Unveiled in 2016, it focuses on protecting "urban wilds" in Boston's neighborhoods. The city has identified four sites in Boston which it is targeting to improve coastal habitats, rejuvenate fish populations, restore soil, and use for flood control and water quality improvement purposes.

The city's creation of the East Boston Greenway, which stretches from the wharfs at Maverick Square to the Bayswater Urban Wild, has also been a major addition to the neighborhood's green space. In 2019, the East Boston Greenway was renamed the Mary Ellen Welch Greenway, honoring Mary Ellen Welch, a well-known community activist. She was one of the first individuals who supported the greenway creation and challenged Massport for their responsibility for noise pollution from the airport.

Today, East Boston has 230 acres of protected open space, and 371 acres of total open space. This averages out to 5.98 acres of protected space per thousand individuals. This is less than the citywide average of 7.43 acres per thousand people.

As of June 2022, East Boston had the lowest tree canopy cover in the city with only 7% coverage compared to the city's 27% total coverage. The low tree coverage has been cited as an additional environmental burden by many activists that deprives the community of benefits like lower air and noise pollution. A youth group from Neighborhood of Affordable Housing began working in 2017 to advocate for greater tree cover in the community and enhance efforts on addressing the lack of cover. In September 2022, Mayor Michelle Wu announced increased efforts from her administration to address low tree coverage in the whole city such as adding more jobs and planting more trees.

=== Housing ===
Until 2011, there were a total of 16,090 housing units in East Boston. Of these, 14,832 were occupied and 1,258 were vacant. Out of the 14,832 occupied units, 4,248 were owner-occupied and 10,584 were renter-occupied. The median gross rent was $1,092.

Homelessness is an issue in the shelters and on the streets of East Boston. To help families transition out of East Boston's homeless shelter, the City of Boston, Crossroads Family Shelter, and the East Boston Community Development Corporation joined in 2015 create subsidized housing on Havre Street. There are seven new affordable units planned.

== East Boston celebrations ==
East Boston has two annual recurring celebrations that take place every summer. Eastie Week takes place for two weeks every July in collaboration between Boston Harbor Now and local partner organizations. During the celebrations, the organizations offer free and affordable events for families in East Boston. Eastie Pride Day is a long-standing celebration founded by former City Councilor Sal LaMattina that takes place at Piers Park. The celebration is open and free to the public and offers food, music, kids games, and community resources.

== Transportation ==
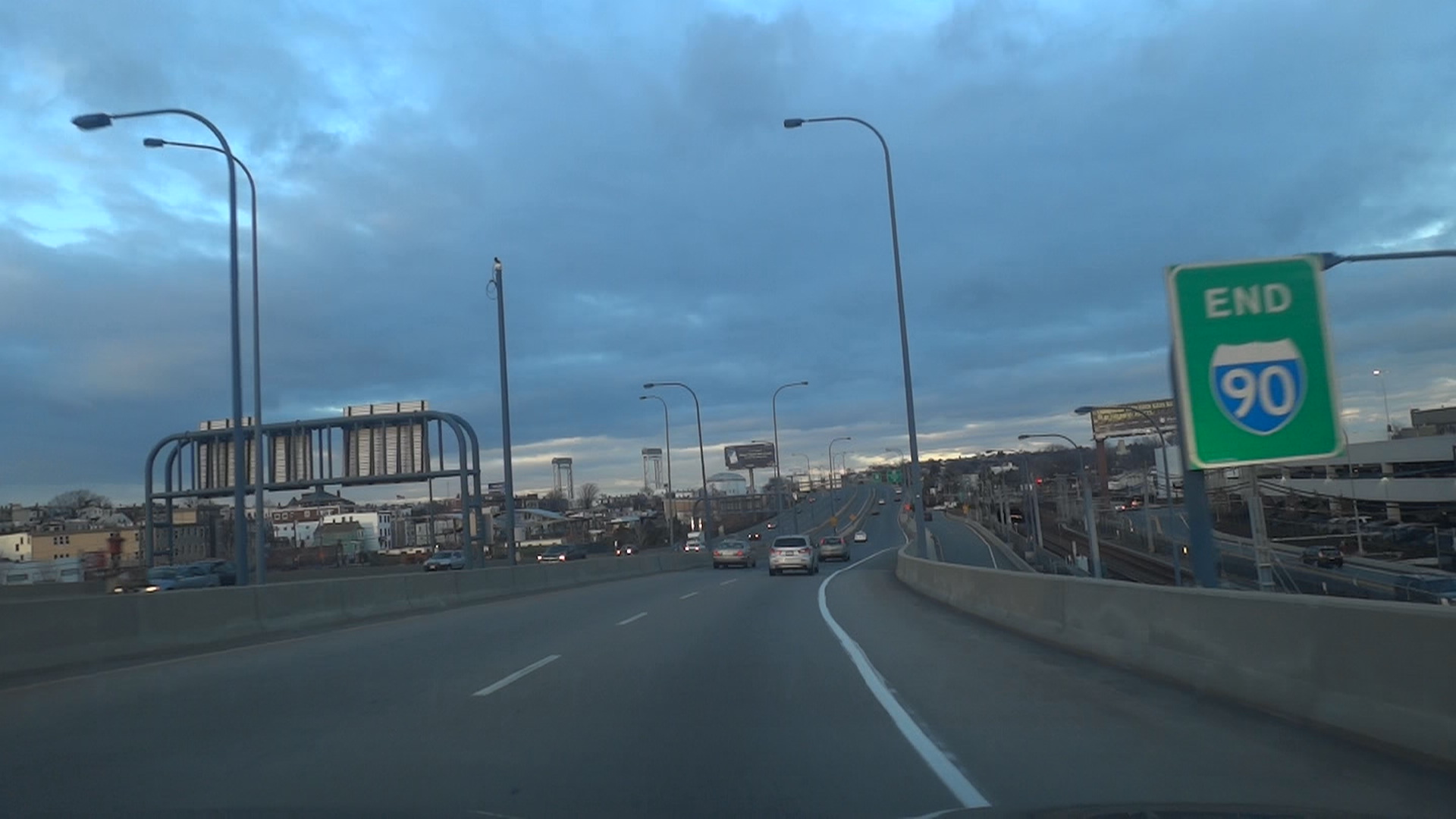
The eastern terminus of I-90 in East Boston

Transportation has long played a role in the shaping of East Boston. Clipper ships were built at the shipyard owned by Donald McKay in the mid-19th century. A subway tunnel connecting the neighborhood to the rest of the city opened in 1904 and was the first undersea tunnel of its kind in the United States. Rows of houses were torn down to build the Sumner Tunnel in 1934 and the Callahan Tunnel in 1961, directly connecting automobile traffic from downtown Boston. In the early 1920s, an airfield was built, and eventually it was expanded to become Logan International Airport. The eastern terminus of Interstate 90 (the Massachusetts Turnpike) has been at Route 1A next to Logan Airport since 2003, and the newer Ted Williams Tunnel (1995) links I-90 from East Boston to the rest of the city.

=== Logan International Airport ===
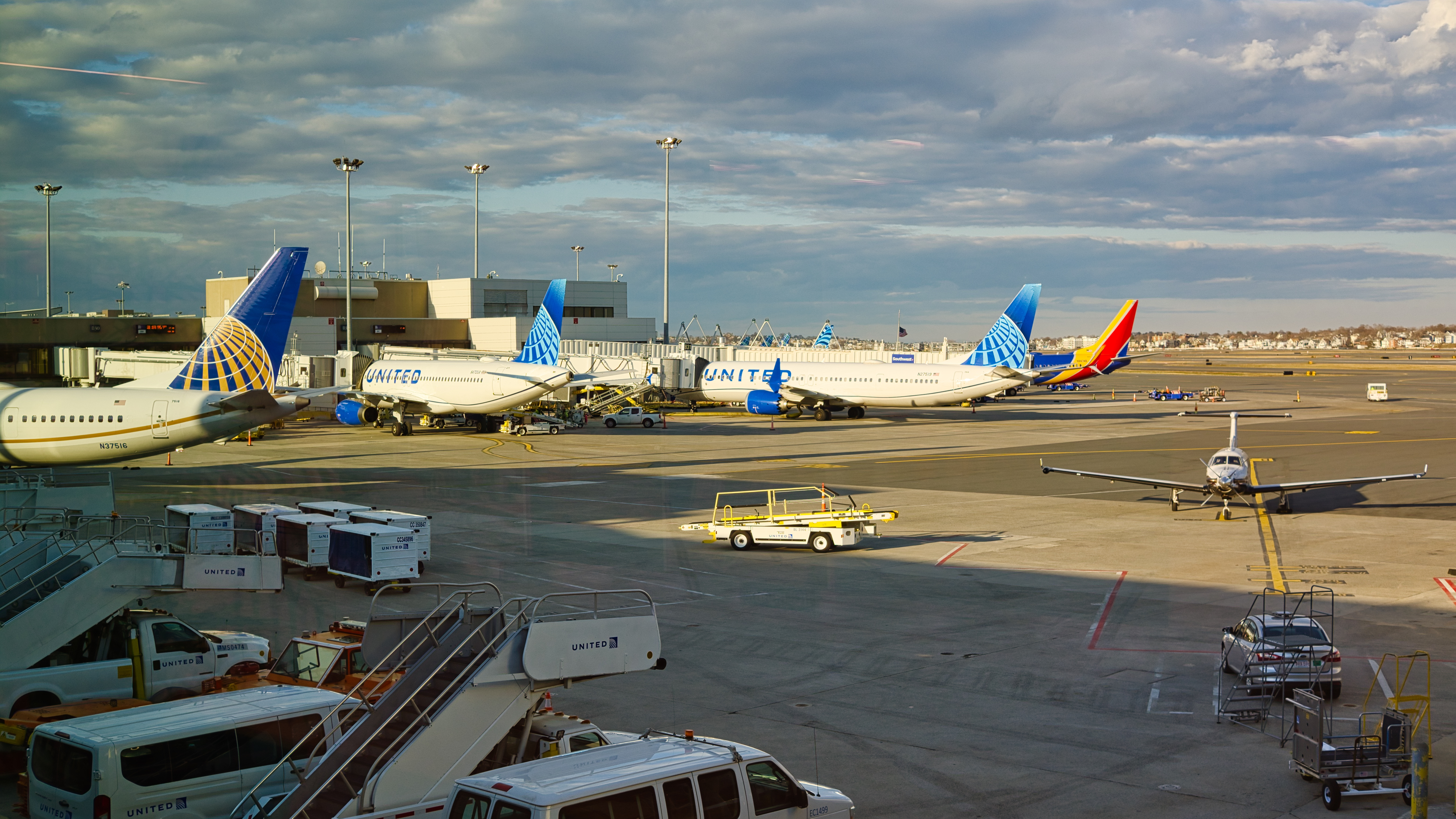
Aircraft at Terminal B at Boston Logan International Airport in March 2022

Logan Airport, New England's primary international airport and 48th busiest in the world, resides mainly in East Boston (though part of the airfield itself lies in Winthrop). There has been continual controversy surrounding Logan, as constant conflict with the Massachusetts Port Authority has been a source of bitterness among some local residents since its inception. One expansion of the Airport resulted in the loss of Wood Island Park, a green space designed by the noted landscape architect Frederick Law Olmsted. The expansion of Logan Airport in the late 1960s and early 1970s displaced families along Neptune Road, which is now used for warehouses and rental car property. The airport has since implemented four "airport edge buffers," which include parks and greenery to appease residents.

The neighborhood is easily accessible to downtown Boston via the MBTA Blue Line, which stops at Maverick, Airport, Wood Island, Orient Heights, and Suffolk Downs in the East Boston area. Massport provides free shuttle buses from the Airport MBTA station to all Logan Airport terminals and the Rental Car Center. The East Boston Greenway, a shared use path and park along a former rail line, connects to the Airport station.

== Notable people ==
- John L. Bates, 41st Governor of Massachusetts
- Benjamin A. Botkin, scholar and folklorist
- Filippo Buccola, gangster, boss of the Patriarca crime family
- Thomas J. Buckley, 18th Massachusetts Auditor
- John J. Douglass, member of the United States House of Representatives from 1925 to 1933
- Frank Greer, rower and Olympic gold medalist
- Helen Johns, swimmer and Olympic gold medalist
- P.J. Kennedy, Massachusetts politician and grandfather of U.S. President John F. Kennedy.
- Augie Lio, former American football player and member of the College Football Hall of Fame
- Frederick Mansfield, 46th Mayor of Boston
- Philip D. McNamara, Catholic priest
- William Matthew Prior, noted painter
- Gene Sharp, scholar
- Robert Travaglini, 93rd President of the Massachusetts Senate
- Jermaine Wiggins, former NFL player and Super Bowl XXXVI champion

== See also ==
- History of Italian Americans in Boston
