= Neighborhoods in Boston =

Neighborhoods of Boston as defined by the City's Office of Neighborhood Services

Boston's diverse neighborhoods serve as a political and cultural organizing mechanism. The City of Boston's Office of Neighborhood Services has designated 23 Neighborhoods in the city:

- Allston
- Back Bay
- Bay Village
- Beacon Hill
- Brighton
- Charlestown
- Chinatown–Leather District
- Dorchester (divided for planning purposes into Mid-Dorchester and Dorchester)
- Downtown
- East Boston
- Fenway–Kenmore (includes Longwood)
- Hyde Park
- Jamaica Plain
- Mattapan
- Mission Hill
- North End
- Roslindale
- Roxbury
- South Boston
- South End
- West End
- West Roxbury
- Wharf District

The islands in Boston Harbor are administered as part of the Boston Harbor Islands National Recreation Area.

The Boston Redevelopment Authority, the City Parking Clerk, and the City's Department of Neighborhood Development have also designated their own neighborhoods. Unofficially, Boston has many overlapping neighborhoods of various sizes. Neighborhood associations have formed around smaller communities or commercial districts (often with "Square" in the name) that have a well-defined center but poorly identified extremities.

== History of Boston's neighborhoods ==
As the city of Boston has grown and evolved, its neighborhoods have changed as well. The names of the West End, North End and South End refer to their positions on the Shawmut Peninsula, the original extent of Boston. Due to the annexation of surrounding communities, those neighborhoods are no longer at those geographic extremities. The Back Bay and Bay Village neighborhoods were formerly part of an actual bay, becoming the neighborhoods they are today after landfill projects expanded the size of the city. Brighton (including Allston), Charlestown, Dorchester (including South Boston, Mid Dorchester, Mattapan and Hyde Park), Roxbury (including West Roxbury, Roslindale and Jamaica Plain), have all at some point been municipalities independent from downtown Boston, providing a source of well-defined boundaries for the largest areas.

== Geographic overview ==
Downtown Boston includes Downtown Crossing, the Financial District and Government Center.

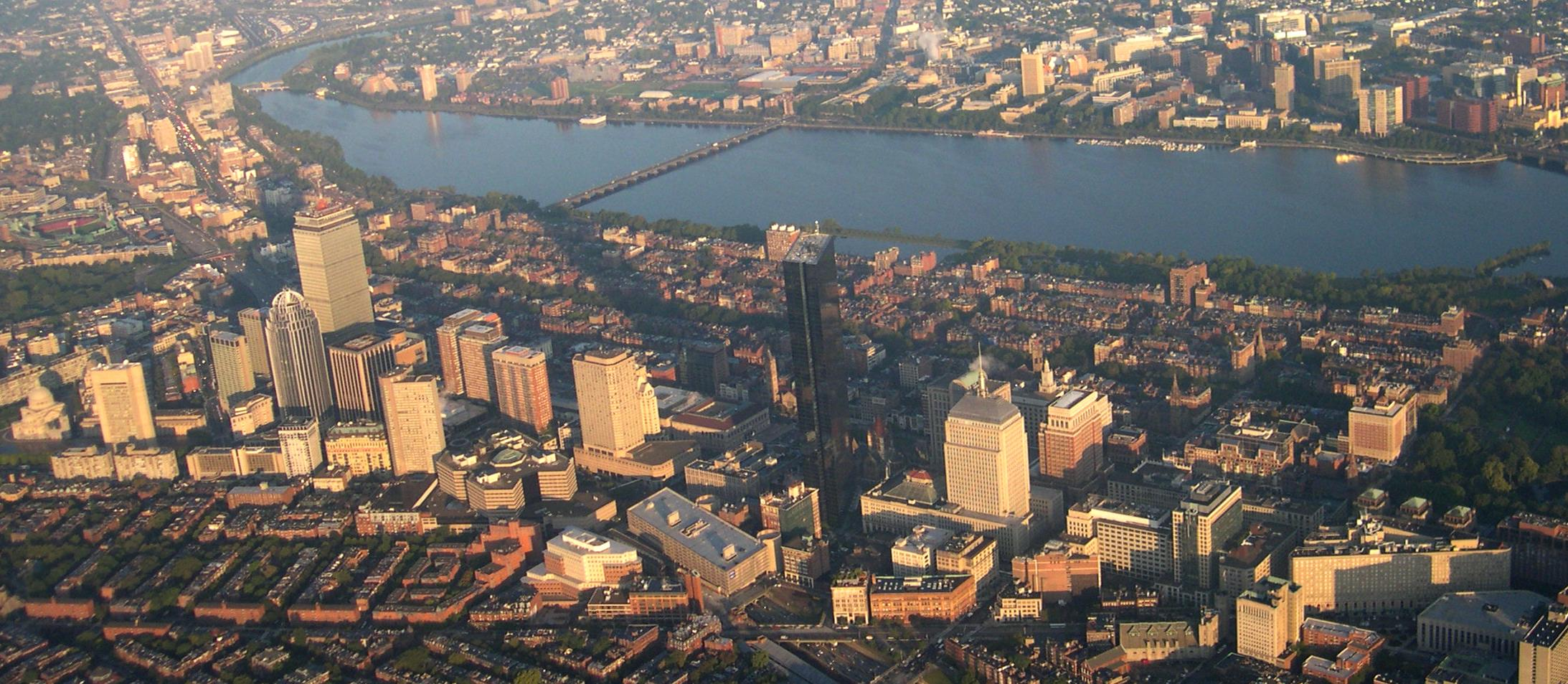
Aerial view of Back Bay and the neighboring City of Cambridge across the Charles River

Surrounding downtown are the neighborhoods of Chinatown/Leather District, South End, North End, West End, Bay Village, Beacon Hill and Back Bay. Chinatown/Leather District is the historical garment district and today has thriving Chinese and other Asian populations. The South End is the center of the city's LGBT population and also populated by artists and young professionals as well as a vibrant Black community. The North End retains an Italian flavor with its many Italian restaurants, though many of its Italian families have moved out, while young professionals have moved in. The Back Bay is west of the Public Garden, and Beacon Hill is the site of the Massachusetts State House. The Back Bay and Beacon Hill are also home to national and local politicians, famous authors and top business leaders and professionals. Bay Village is one of the smallest neighborhoods in Boston and mostly contains Greek Revival-style row houses.

North and east of downtown are the neighborhoods of East Boston and Charlestown. East Boston has a majority of Hispanics, Brazilians, and young professionals, with a remnant of older Italians, and is the site of Logan International Airport. On the north bank of the Charles River is Charlestown; once a predominantly Irish enclave and site of the Bunker Hill Monument, it is now a home for young professionals.

West of downtown are the neighborhoods of Fenway Kenmore, Allston, Brighton, Longwood and Mission Hill. Fenway Kenmore borders the campus of Boston University and houses many college students and young professionals and is the location of Fenway Park. Allston and Brighton are populated heavily by students from nearby universities, as well as recent graduates. Mission Hill is an ethnically diverse neighborhood, adjacent to the Longwood area, which is full of world-class medical institutions.

South of downtown are the neighborhoods of Roxbury, Jamaica Plain, Dorchester, Mid Dorchester and South Boston. Dorchester, including Mid Dorchester, is Boston's largest neighborhood and predominantly a working class community considered to be Boston's most diverse. Roxbury is populated largely by Black Americans, Caribbean Americans and Latinos and is historically the center of Boston's Black community. Jamaica Plain is a community of white professionals and Latinos, and includes the larger side of the Arnold Arboretum. South Boston is a predominantly Irish-American neighborhood, which hosts the city's annual St. Patrick's Day parade.

South of Roxbury, Jamaica Plain and Dorchester are the neighborhoods of Mattapan, Roslindale, Hyde Park and West Roxbury. Roslindale is known for its small business district and includes the smaller side of the Arnold Arboretum. Roslindale has also recently become a majority-minority neighborhood. Mattapan remains the neighborhood with Boston's highest concentrations of Black Americans. Hyde Park and West Roxbury have a distinct suburban feel, while still being a part of the city of Boston. Both neighborhoods have large areas of wooded parks and recreation land. Hyde Park is populated largely by Black and Caribbean Americans, whereas West Roxbury is predominantly white, but with rapidly growing Black American, Middle Eastern and Latino populations.

== List of places and squares within neighborhood areas ==
The 23 official neighborhoods in Boston are made up of approximately 84 sub-districts, squares and neighborhoods within each official neighborhood. The Boston Redevelopment Authority defines 16 planning districts (plus the Boston Harbor Islands) and 64 Neighborhood Statistical Areas (with four areas further subdivided). These correspond roughly with the neighborhoods and sub-neighborhoods of Boston. Unofficially, Boston is made up of approximately 105 neighborhoods.

- Allston and Brighton
  - Allston Village
  - Brighton Center
  - Cleveland Circle
  - Harvard Stadium/Charlesview
  - Union Square
  - Oak Square
  - Faneuil Square
  - Brighton Mills
  - Lower Allston
  - North Brighton
  - Packard's Corner
  - Soldier's Field
- Back Bay
  - Copley Square/Boston Public Library
  - Commonwealth Avenue Mall
  - Newbury Street

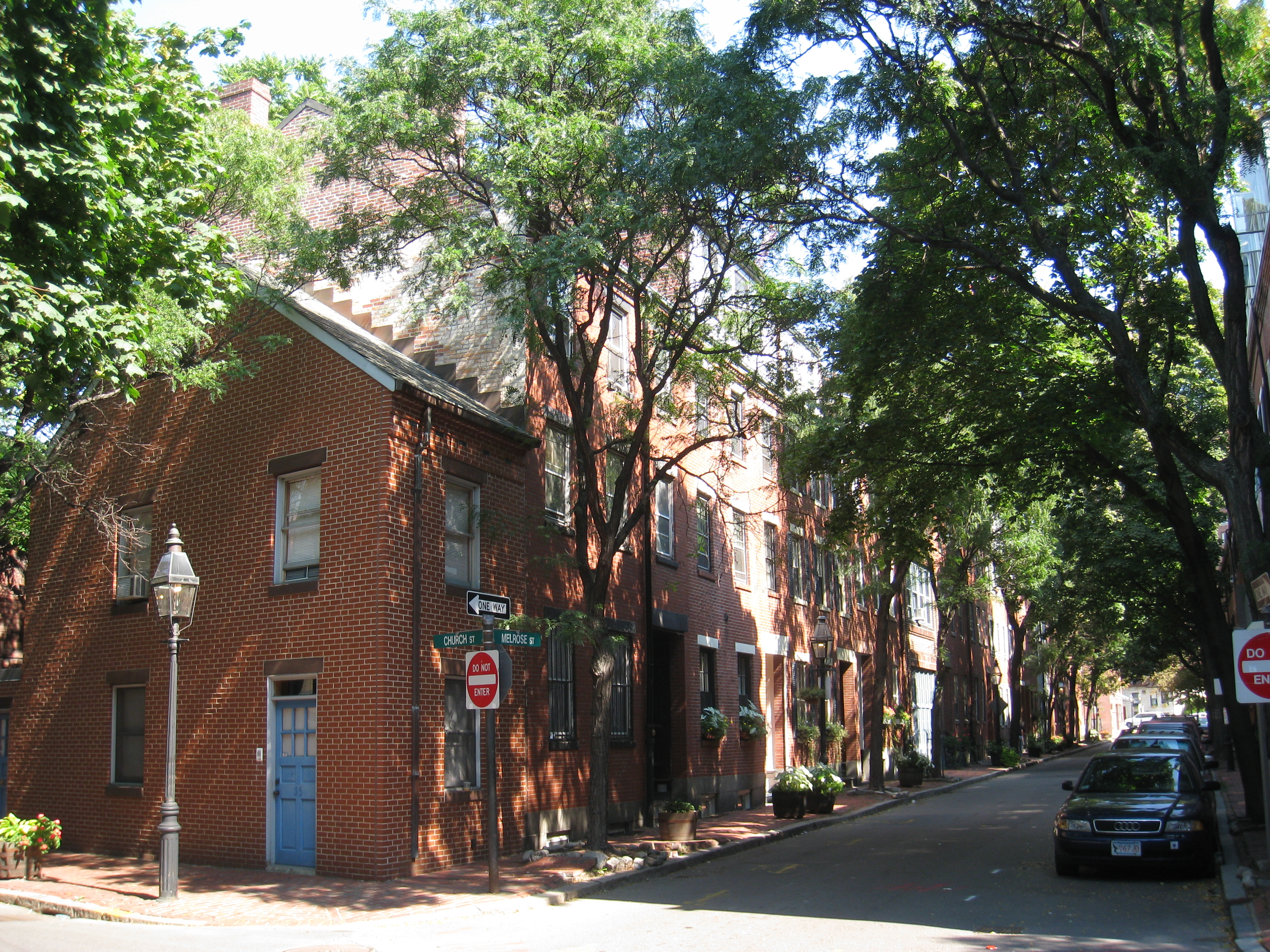
General view of Bay Village

- Bay Village (also known as South Cove)
- Beacon Hill
  - Louisburg Square
  - Massachusetts State House
- Charlestown
  - Bunker Hill
  - The Neck
  - The Navy Yard
  - Hayes Square
  - City Square
  - Thompson Square
  - Sullivan Square
- Chestnut Hill
- Chinatown and the Leather District
- Dorchester
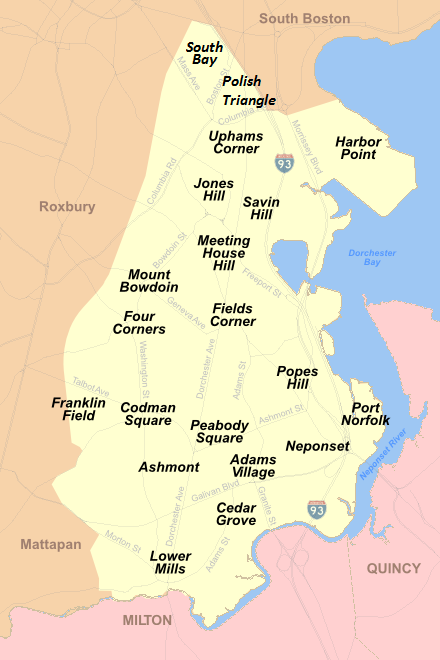
  Map of Mid Dorchester and Dorchester
  - Adams Corner/Adams Village
  - Ashmont (including Ashmont Hill, Ashmont-Adams and Peabody Square)
  - Columbia Point/Harbor Point
  - South Bay
  - Cedar Grove
  - Fields Corner
  - Franklin Field
  - Grove Hall
  - Lower Mills
  - Jones Hill
  - Meeting House Hill
  - Neponset
  - Polish Triangle (extends into South Boston)
  - Popes Hill
  - Port Norfolk
  - Savin Hill
  - Uphams Corner
- Downtown Boston and the Financial District
  - Bulfinch Triangle
  - Combat Zone (defunct)
  - Downtown Crossing/Ladder District
  - Fort Hill Square
  - Government Center
  - Haymarket Square (Boston)
  - Post Office Square
  - South Station
  - Boston Theater District
  - Waterfront
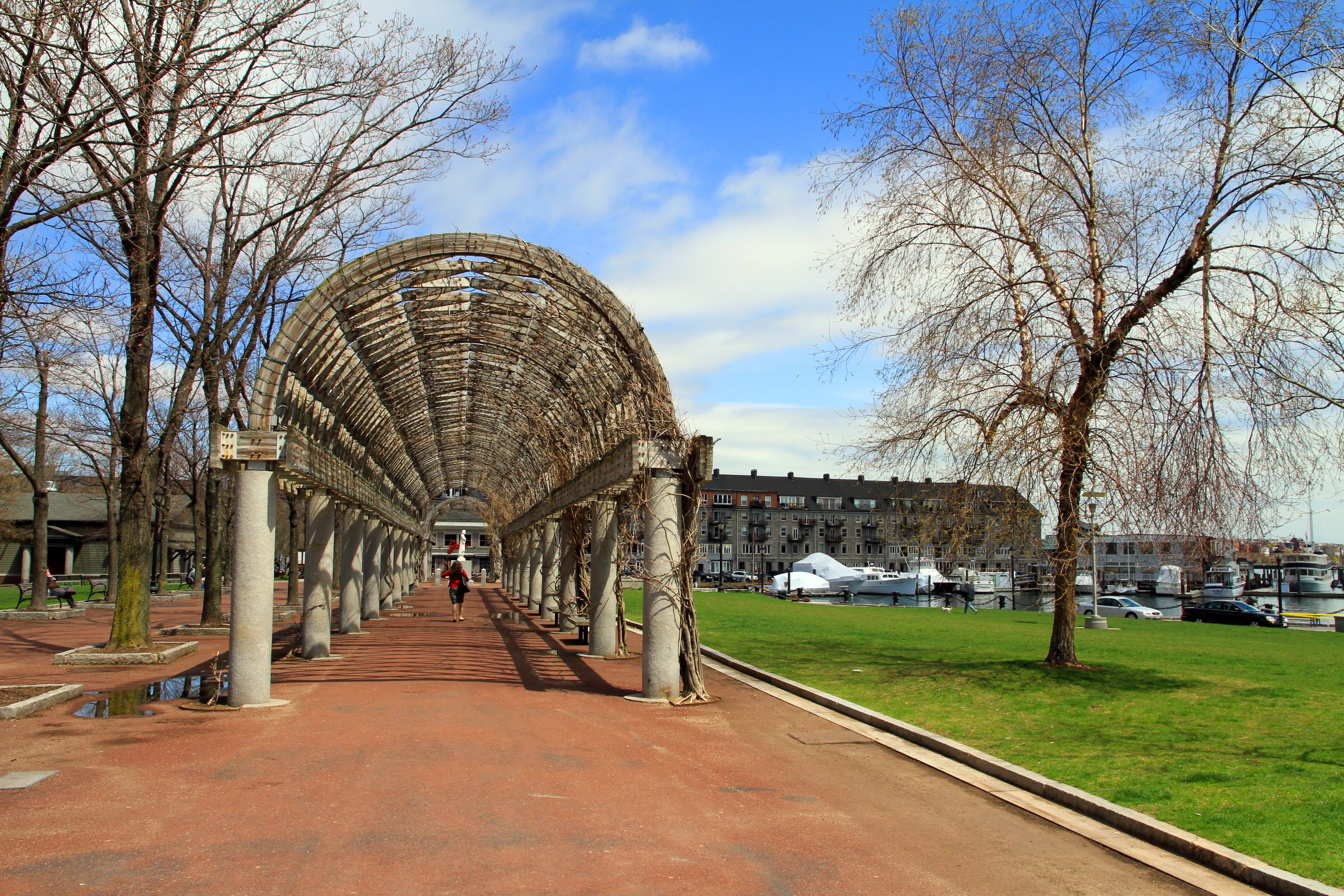
    Christopher Columbus Park in Downtown Waterfront
- East Boston
  - Eagle Hill
  - Jeffries Point
  - Orient Heights
  - Central Square
  - Day Square
  - Maverick Square
  - Boston Logan International Airport
  - Ted Williams Tunnel
  - Callahan Tunnel
  - Sumner Tunnel
  - Suffolk Downs
- Fenway/Kenmore
  - Audubon Circle
  - Back Bay Fens
  - Kenmore Square
  - Boston University (extends into Allston)
  - Longwood Medical Area (extends into Mission Hill)
  - Lansdowne Street/Fenway Park
- Hyde Park
  - Readville
  - Fairmount Hill
  - Sunnyside

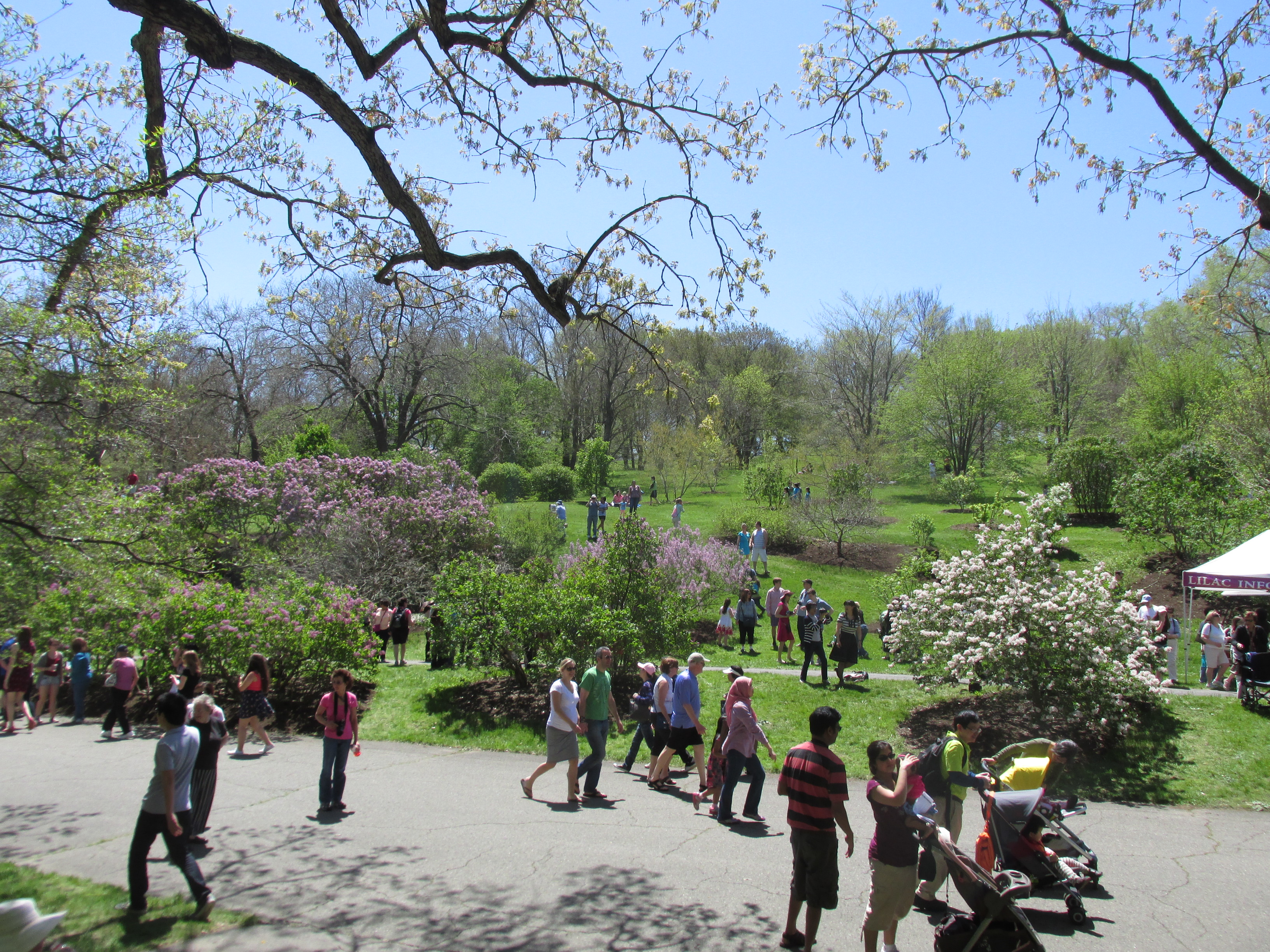
Lilac Sunday, Arnold Arboretum, Jamaica Plain

- Jamaica Plain
  - Hyde Square
  - Forest Hills/Woodbourne
  - Moss Hill
- Mattapan
  - Wellington Hill
  - Mattapan Square
- Mid Dorchester
  - Bowdoin-Geneva
  - Codman Square
  - Four Corners
- Mission Hill and Longwood
  - Brigham Circle
  - Back of the Hill
  - Parker Hill
- North End
  - Ann Street (North Street)
  - Hanover Street

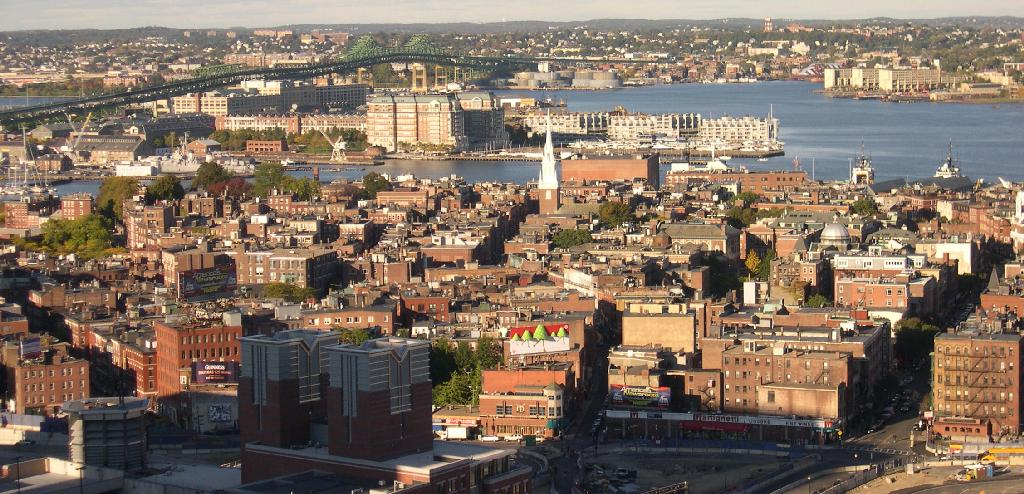
North End, Boston

- Roslindale
  - Roslindale Square
- Roxbury
  - Egleston Square
  - Fort Hill
  - Franklin Park (extends into Jamaica Plain and Dorchester)
  - Nubian Square (formerly Dudley Square)
  - Roxbury Crossing
- South Boston
  - Andrew Square (extends into Dorchester)
  - D Street
  - Dorchester Heights / Telegraph Hill
  - Fort Point
  - South Boston Waterfront/Seaport District
  - City Point
- South End
  - South of Washington (SoWa)
- West End
  - Charles Street
  - North Station/TD Garden
  - Massachusetts General Hospital
- West Roxbury
  - Parkway (extends into Roslindale)
