= Allston =

Neighborhood of Boston, Massachusetts

Coordinates: 42.3529°N 71.1321°W

- Neighborhood of Boston
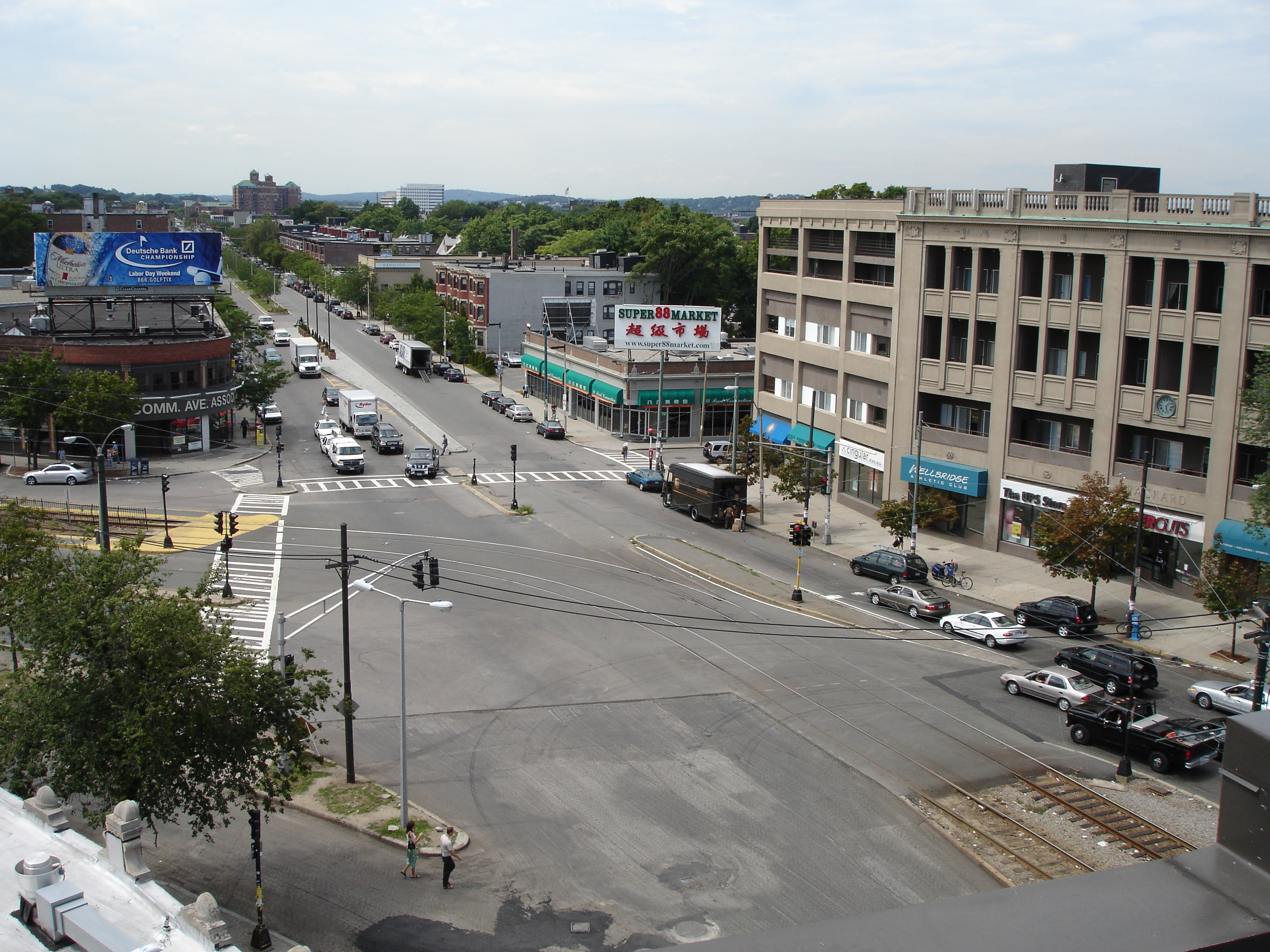
- Packard's Corner at the intersection of Commonwealth Avenue and Brighton Avenue in Allston
- Nicknames: Allston, Rock City, Rat City
- Interactive map of Allston
- Country: United States
- State: Massachusetts
- County: Suffolk
- Neighborhood of: Boston
- Time zone: UTC−5 (Eastern)
- Zip Code: 02134
- Area codes: 617 & 857

Allston is an officially recognized neighborhood in Boston, Massachusetts, United States. It was named after the American painter and poet Washington Allston. It comprises the land covered by the zip code 02134. For the most part, Allston is administered collectively with the adjacent neighborhood of Brighton. The two are often referred to together as Allston–Brighton. Boston Police Department District D-14 covers the Allston-Brighton area and a Boston Fire Department Allston station is located in Union Square which houses Engine 41 and Ladder 14. Engine 41 is nicknamed "The Bull" to commemorate the historic stockyards of Allston.

Housing stock varies but largely consists of brick apartment buildings, especially on Commonwealth Avenue and the streets directly off it, while areas further down Brighton Avenue, close to Brighton, are largely dotted with wooden triple-deckers. Lower Allston, across the Massachusetts Turnpike from the southern portion of Allston, consists of mostly 1890–1920s single-family and multi-family Victorian homes.

== Area description ==
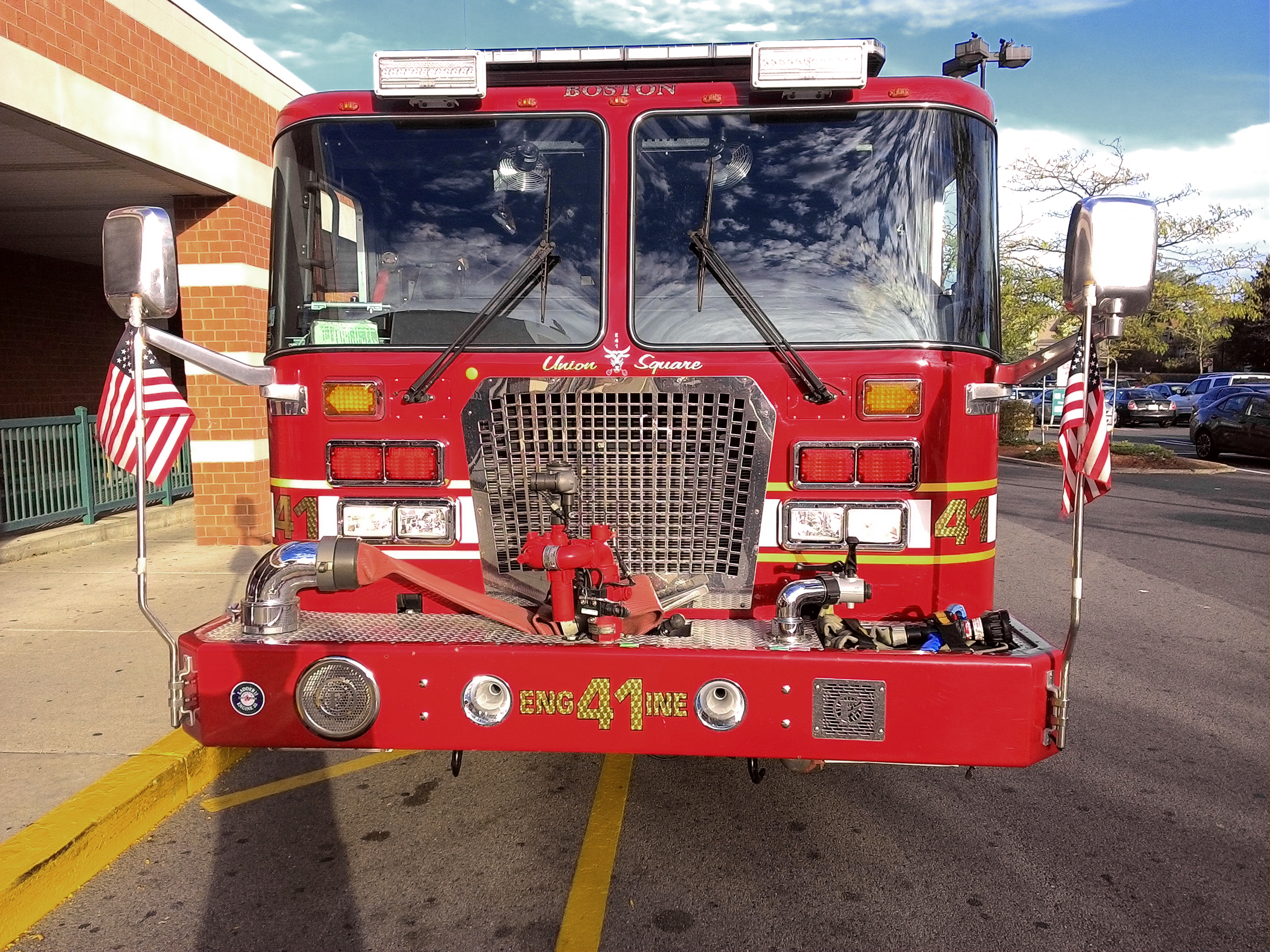
Engine 41 Boston Fire Department in Allston neighborhood in 2015

Allston borders the Boston neighborhoods of Fenway, Kenmore, and Brighton and the town of Brookline. Allston is bordered on the east and north by the Charles River, and Cambridge, Massachusetts, is accessible via several bridges.

The area north of the turnpike near the Charles River is known as Lower Allston (or North Allston). It consists of streets north of Cambridge Street and the Turnpike, all the way to the Charles River. It extends westward to Everett Street and eastward to the Charles River. In its center is Allston Square at the crossroads of Western Avenue and North Harvard Street. Allston is named for the great painter and 1800 Harvard graduate, Washington Allston, "The Father of American Romanticism". Allston Square is appropriately located halfway between Harvard Square in the north and Allston Village, Boston's 'Greenwich Village' in the south. Allston claims to be the only community in America named for an artist.

Lower Allston is a small neighborhood that consists of a mix of young professionals, blue-collar tradesmen, members of the educational community, homeowners, and long-term residents. Unlike the rest of Allston, Lower Allston has far fewer students. The neighborhood is very quiet, has extremely low crime, and is an easy walk to Allston Village or Harvard Square.

Lower Allston has close proximity to Route 2, the Mass Pike, Storrow Drive, and Soldiers Field Road. Public transportation includes the Red Line at Harvard Square, the Green Line at Packard's Corner or Harvard Avenue and Commonwealth Avenue and the 57, 66, 70, 71, and 86 bus connections on North Harvard Street and Western Avenue.

In the early 21st century, Harvard University announced dramatic expansion plans that called for major building projects, including the demolition of existing businesses, to prepare for the construction of new biology and science buildings in the northern sections of Lower Allston. While the existing building stock was demolished and businesses were evicted, the 2008 financial crisis and the resultant decrease in Harvard's endowment caused the university to suspend the expansion projects. In 2016, Harvard began building again, has completed two new buildings and is starting on the new, state-of-the-art Paulson School of Engineering and Applied Sciences on Western Avenue west of Allston Square by the Charles River. Later, it will begin construction of the "Gateway" building on the northeastern corner of Allston Square.

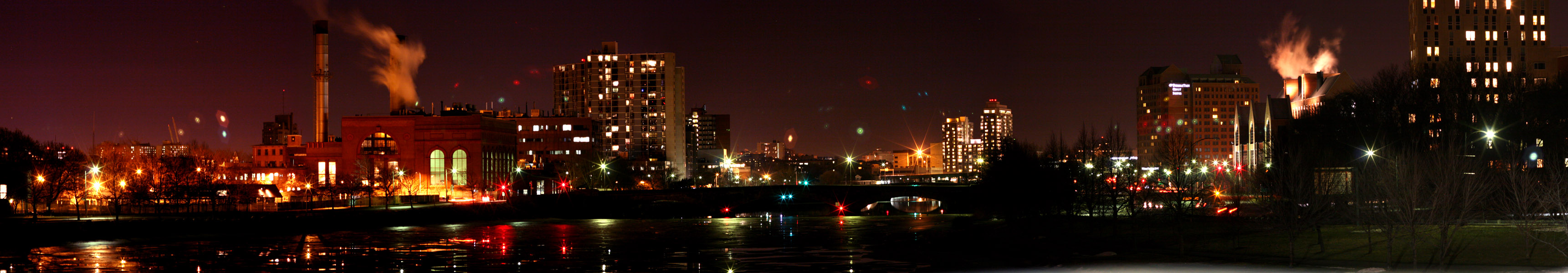
The Charles River viewed at night in winter from the Weeks footbridge with Allston to the right and Cambridge, Massachusetts to the left.

== History ==
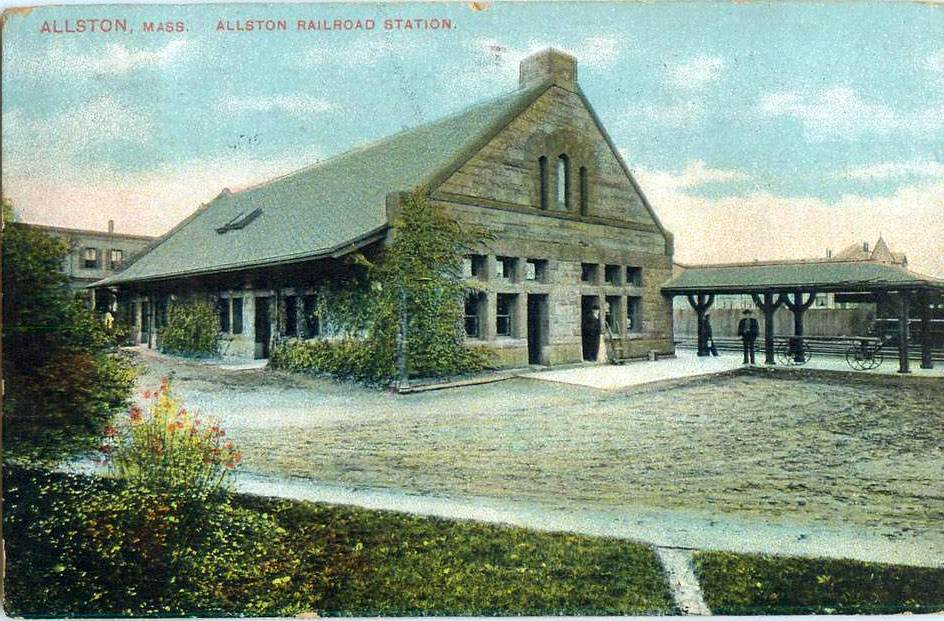
Allston Railroad Station, about 1909

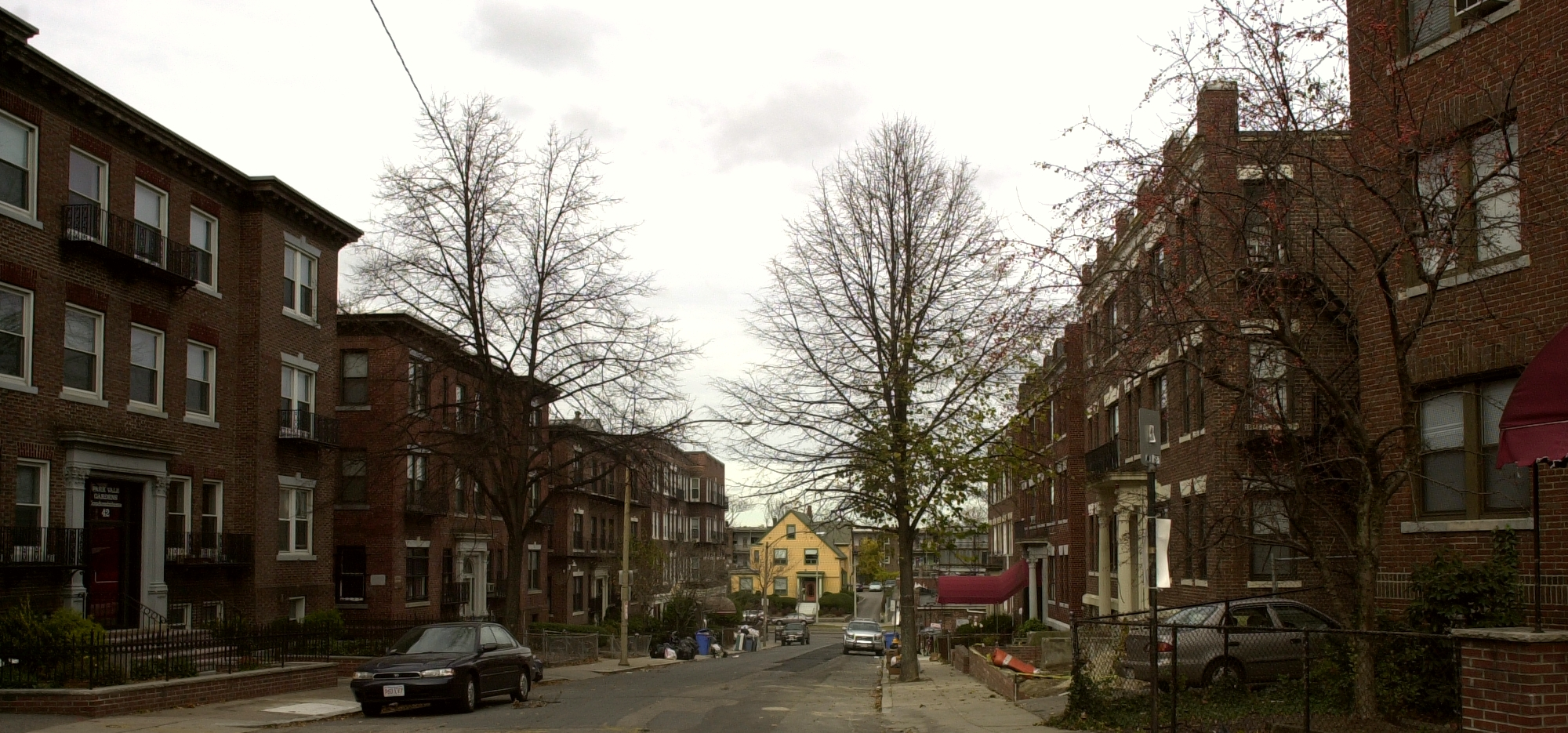
Park Vale Avenue looking toward Brighton Avenue

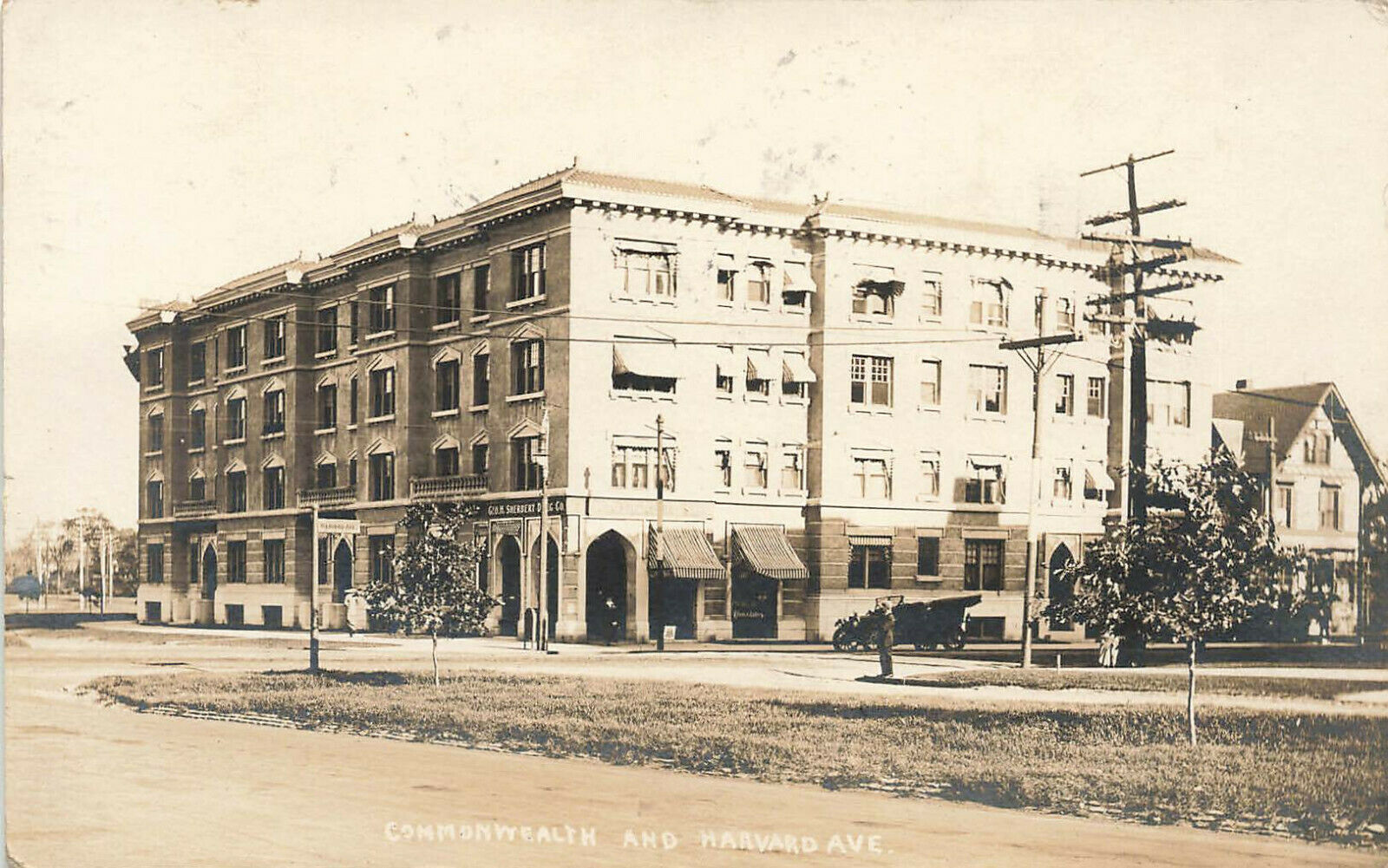
1222 Commonwealth Avenue in 1912

Allston was an eastern section of the former town of Brighton.

In 1867, a new railroad depot for the Boston and Albany Railroad opened. In 1868 the station and post office in Brighton's eastern portion were given the name "Allston" after Washington Allston, the noted painter who had lived and worked across the Charles River in the Cambridgeport section of Cambridge. It can even be said to have been named for a specific painting: Washington Allston's "Fields West of Boston".

Allston has never existed as a separate political entity in its own right. Brighton was annexed by the City of Boston in 1874. Henry Wadsworth Longfellow owned several properties in Allston. In 1887 the wooden depot was replaced by the station depicted at the right. In 1888 Boston's first trolley route began there, running a route through Coolidge Corner, Brookline, to Boylston Street, to downtown Boston.

The Allston community developed largely around large railroad and livestock operations. The Boston and Albany Railroad operated a major rail yard. Stockyards and a large abattoir operated nearby in the northern part of Brighton. All livestock activity ended by the mid-20th century, although much of the rail yard remained in use until 2013 as CSX Transportation's Beacon Park Yard.

A strip running from Brighton Avenue in Allston out Commonwealth Avenue toward Kenmore Square was Boston's original "Automile", lined with automobile dealerships. Packard's Sales Stable and Riding School gave Packard's Corner its name, which was then perpetuated by the presence of an opulent Packard dealership. Only a Toyota dealer and a Vespa dealer remain, but the windowed buildings along the eastern end of Brighton Avenue reflect this history.

The Massachusetts Turnpike Extension, built largely on part of the Boston and Albany right-of-way, opened through Allston in 1964 and 1965.

== Culture ==
Allston is home to numerous small businesses and restaurants. Brighton Avenue, between Packard's Corner and Allston Street, boasts various ethnic and national cuisines from around the world. Harvard Avenue hosts a number of furniture stores, thrift shops, and stores that offer items for resale, due to the large student body and high residential turnover.

The section of the neighborhood that lies immediately south of the turnpike and centers on the stretch of Harvard Avenue between Commonwealth Avenue and Cambridge Street also houses many shops, bars, and restaurants. Recent business promotion initiatives have dubbed this area "Allston Village". This area is also home to a concentration of Korean American businesses and restaurants.

=== Allston Christmas ===
Annually, during days leading up to and following September 1, Allston, the Fenway–Kenmore area, the Longwood area, Mission Hill, and Brighton (among many others in Greater Boston) experience a period known as Allston Christmas. This period is referred to as such because it is the time of year when renters (many of whom are college students) move out their things so new renters (also frequently college students) can move in.

A large number of rental agreements in Greater Boston expire on September 1, just before the Labor Day weekend, causing large numbers of tenants to move to their new quarters simultaneously. This synchronized mass movement also makes it difficult to rent large vehicles during the weeks surrounding September 1. The renters who are leaving often put their unwanted possessions out in the streets for those who may want the items, which include bedding, couches, tables, kitchenware, and clothing. Unsalvaged items also contribute to unusually large trash and recycling pickups scheduled around the time.

=== Music ===
Brighton Music Hall, a concert venue in Allston, 2026

Music venues in Allston include Brighton Music Hall (formerly Harpers Ferry), Great Scott, O'Brien's Pub, Paradise Rock Club, Scullers Jazz Club, and The Silhouette Lounge.

Several recording studios are located in the neighborhood, such as Galaxy Park, established in 1999. Allston's music scene includes a DIY community. The annual Allston-Brighton parade and annual Allston DIY Fest feature many of the neighborhood's musical acts.

In the 1960s, Boston Mayor Kevin White developed Summerthing, a series of free concerts performed at Allston's Ringer Park. Several Rock and Roll Hall of Fame artists played for free, including The Byrds, Bo Diddley, BB King and Chuck Berry.

=== Sports ===
Major League Baseball's Boston Braves played at Braves Field (now Boston University's Nickerson Field) at Allston's eastern edge, from 1915 to 1952. The Boston Patriots of the American Football League (now the New England Patriots of the National Football League) played four seasons in Allston: at Nickerson Field in 1960 through 1962; and at Harvard Stadium in 1970.

== Education ==
=== Public schools ===
Public schools in Allston are part of the school district of Boston Public Schools.

Gardner Pilot Academy (also called the Thomas Gardner School), located on Athol Street, serves Allston residents pre-kindergarten through grade eight. In April 2008, a science teacher at Gardner Pilot Academy won the "Ultimate Science Classroom", a raffle prize furnished annually by the National Science Teachers Association. The school received approximately $40,000 in science teaching materials and apparatus.

The Horace Mann School for the Deaf and Hard of Hearing and the Jackson-Mann K-8 school used to be located on Armington Street. Due to structural issues with the buildings, the Jackson-Mann school closed permanently in 2022, and the Horace Mann School relocated to Charlestown in 2024. Students from the Jackson-Mann school were redistributed across the district.

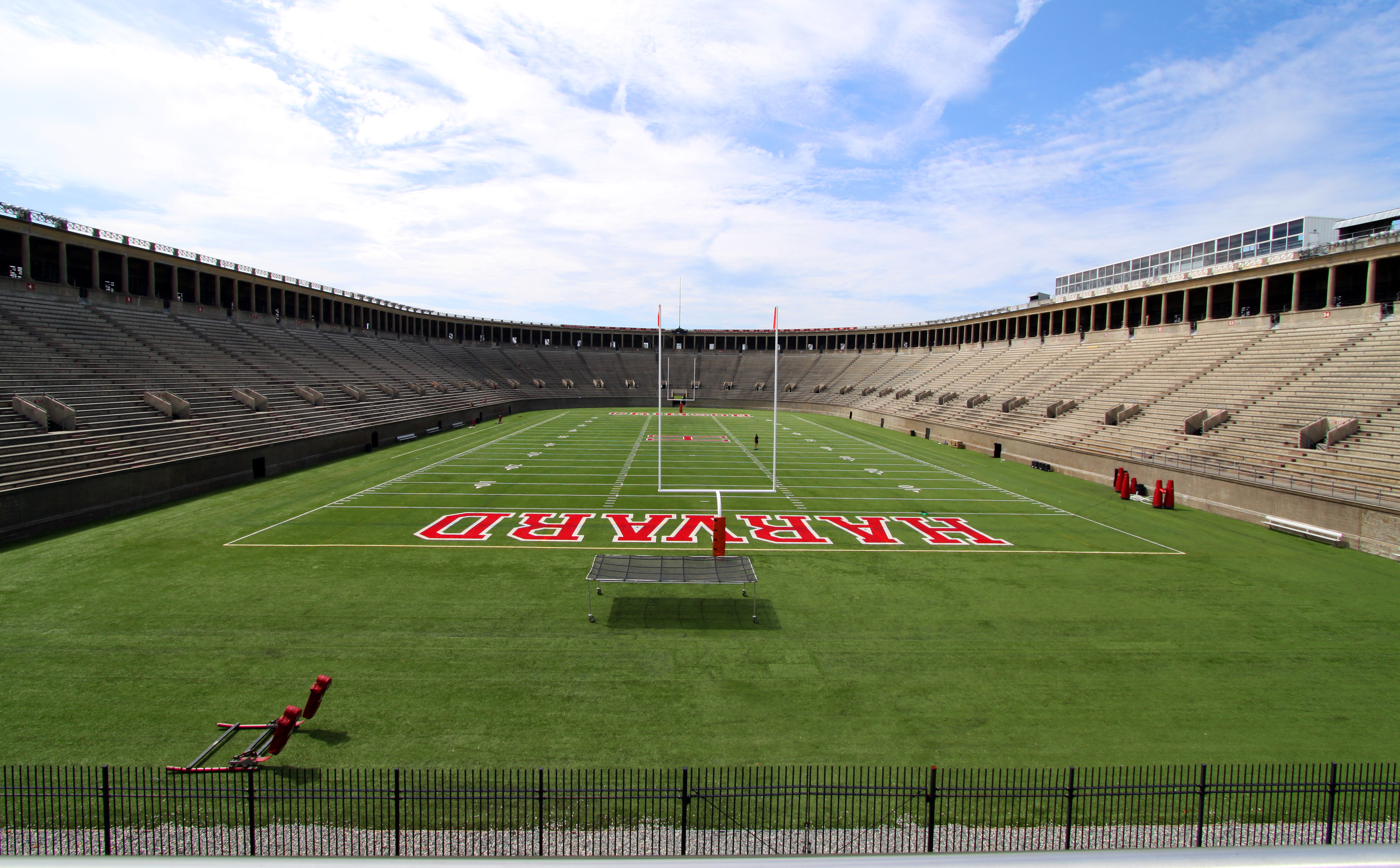
Harvard Stadium in Allston hosts college football games.

=== Private schools ===
German International School Boston (previously called "German School Boston"), located on Holton Street, is a private, bilingual, international school in Boston, Massachusetts. This German school abroad was established in 2001 and officially inaugurated by Former German President Johannes Rau. The upper campus serves grades one through twelve, and the lower campus offers a preschool and kindergarten program. The school has over 300 students.

=== Colleges and universities ===
Allston lies near three major universities. A substantial part of the campus of Harvard University, including Harvard Business School and most athletic facilities (such as the Bright-Landry Hockey Center, Harvard Stadium, and the Lavietes Pavilion), are in North Allston. Harvard also owns large portions of other land in North Allston, much of which it plans to develop as an academic campus, particularly for the Harvard John A. Paulson School of Engineering and Applied Sciences, as well as an auxiliary site for the Harvard Medical School and other healthcare-related programs. Eventually, Harvard's Allston campus will be physically larger than their original Cambridge campus.

Boston University lies along Commonwealth Avenue to the east, with numerous schools and facilities extending from Kenmore Square to Packard's Corner. The New Balance Field of Boston University symbolizes further integration of BU into the Allston community and is the first in a series of projects that have included the creation of a major new dormitory building in the area. Berklee College of Music also has a practice and rehearsal building near Commonwealth Avenue on Fordham Road which runs between Commonwealth Avenue and Brighton Avenue.

== Transportation ==
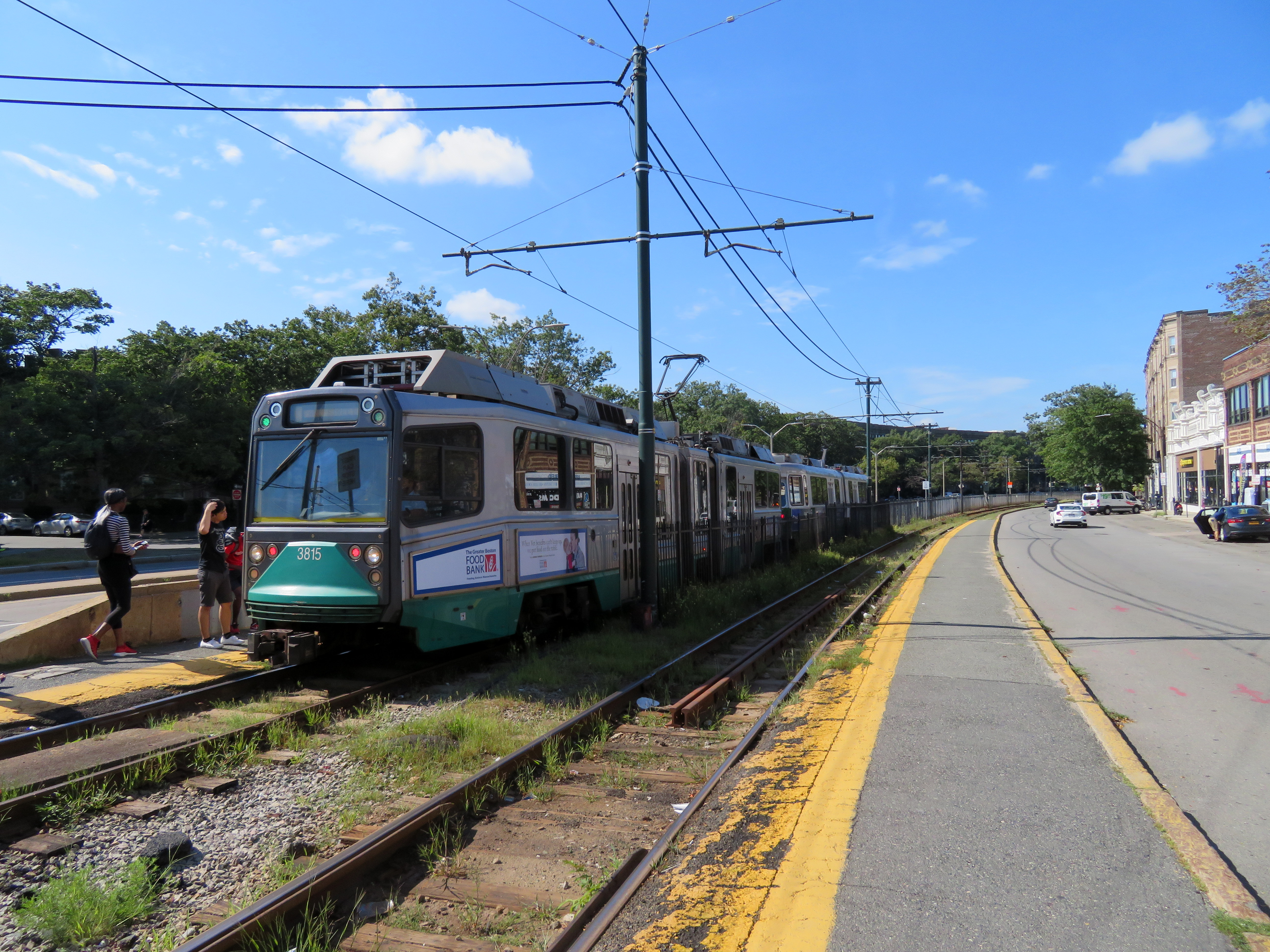
A Green Line train at Packard's Corner station.

The B branch of the Boston MBTA subway Green Line runs through the neighborhood along Commonwealth Avenue. Until 1969, the Green Line A branch to Watertown Square ran along Brighton Avenue. Today, MBTA Bus Route 57 runs on a similar route. From 2014 to March 2016, the MBTA included bus route 57 in its late night service, running until 3 am. The City of Boston and the MBTA installed bus lane between Union Square and Packard's Corner with construction starting in 2019 to alleviate congestion and speed up bus travel times. Other MBTA bus lines serve Allston, including routes 64, 66, 70 and 86. In 2017, 34.2% of Allston residents commuted by mass transit, while 24.3% commuted by walking and another 6.6% commuted by bicycle.

Until 2013, the CSX Railroad operated the large Beacon Park freight yard which runs adjacent to the Massachusetts Turnpike; the land has been purchased by Harvard. In May 2006, Harvard officials said that they wanted an infill commuter rail stop in Allston on the Framingham/Worcester line. This would restore service lacking since the closure of the Allston train depot. As of 2009, there had been actions by the state legislature to restore train service in the area. In June 2012, plans were announced for a station to be called Boston Landing, located in Brighton, to serve the Allston-Brighton area. Originally intended to open in 2014, the station finally opened in 2017.

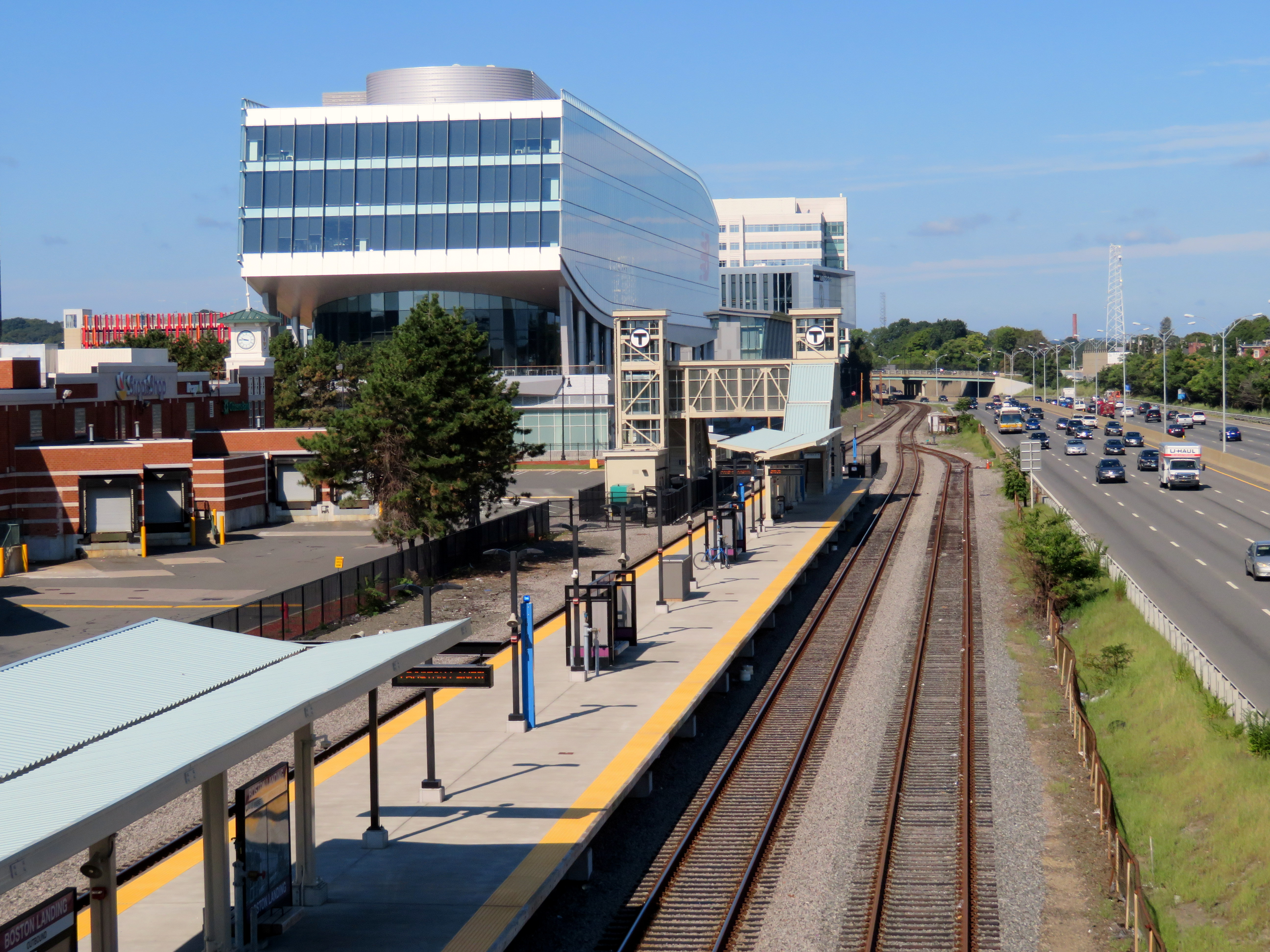
Boston Landing station, a commuter rail stop.

In September 2014, plans for a $25 million commuter rail station called West Station were announced. The station's construction will coincide with a plan to straighten the Massachusetts Turnpike over the former CSX rail yard. The new station will initially operate exclusively on the Worcester/Framingham line but will be constructed with four platforms to accommodate future uses that may include rapid-transit service to North Station via the existing Grand Junction Railroad through Cambridge and Somerville.

== Demographics ==
The estimated population of Allston is 28,621, according to the 2020 Census. The median home cost is $632,000, an incline of 5.2% in the last year. The cost of living is 48.7% higher than the national average. The population density is 14,035/mi^{2}. The median age is 27.

Allston is home to many immigrant populations, the largest groups being from Russia, East Asia (particularly Korea), South Asia, and South America (particularly Brazil and Colombia).

Young adults (age 18–34) make up 80.8% of the neighborhood's population (as compared to 39.1% for the city of Boston as a whole). The high concentration of students and "twenty-somethings" has created tension between some long-time residents and the student population which constantly cycles in and out as students matriculate and graduate from Boston's many colleges and universities. In addition to nightly dancing and live music at area bars, house parties abound on surrounding streets, particularly during the school year. This has long been a sore point among other Allston residents.

The largest religious affiliation is Catholic (48.2%), followed by unspecified Christian (4.9%), Baptist (2%), and Muslim (1%).

=== Race ===
Allston (02134) Racial Breakdown of Population (2017)
Race	Percentage of 02134 population	Percentage of Massachusetts population	Percentage of United States population	ZIP Code-to-State Difference	ZIP Code-to-USA Difference
White	62.8%	81.3%	76.6%	–18.5%	–13.8%
White (Non-Hispanic)	56.6%	72.1%	60.7%	–15.5%	–4.1%
Asian	21.3%	6.9%	5.8%	+14.4%	+15.5%
Hispanic	12.7%	11.9%	18.1%	+0.8%	–5.4%
Black	6.2%	8.8%	13.4%	–2.6%	–7.2%
Native Americans/Hawaiians	0.3%	0.6%	1.5%	–0.3%	–1.2%
Two or more races	4.0%	2.4%	2.7%	+1.6%	+1.3%

Allston/Harvard Business School (02163) Racial Breakdown of Population (2017)
Race	Percentage of 02163 population	Percentage of Massachusetts population	Percentage of United States population	ZIP Code-to-State Difference	ZIP Code-to-USA Difference
White	65.5%	81.3%	76.6%	–15.8%	–11.1%
White (Non-Hispanic)	56.8%	72.1%	60.7%	–15.3%	–3.9%
Asian	21.5%	6.9%	5.8%	+14.6%	+15.7%
Hispanic	10.2%	11.9%	18.1%	–1.7%	–7.9%
Black	7.5%	8.8%	13.4%	–1.3%	–5.9%
Native Americans/Hawaiians	0.3%	0.6%	1.5%	–0.3%	–1.2%
Two or more races	4.2%	2.4%	2.7%	+1.8%	+1.5%

== Events ==
- Allston Squirt Gun Day is an unsanctioned event organized by young residents and held yearly in late August. Participants are asked to wear green and gather at the intersection of Harvard Avenue and Brighton Avenue. The event is typically short-lived as it creates a panic among those unaware of what is going on. In 2009, the Squirt Gun festivities continued as a sanctioned event at nearby Ringer Park.
- In 2005, the New England Foundation for the Arts selected a site in Allston for its Art & Community Landscapes program. The artist team of Legge Lewis Legge was chosen to design this site which is known as the Lincoln Street Green Strip.
- Each year the community hosts the Allston Village Street Fair on Harvard Avenue between Brighton Avenue and Cambridge Street. The fair features live performances, international food, and local businesses, along with family-friendly activities.
- In 2012, Aerosmith played a set in front of their former residence at 1325 Commonwealth Avenue. They were introduced by the New England Patriots players (most notably Tom Brady), owner Robert Kraft, and cheerleaders.
- Allston is home to the annual Rat City Arts Festival, so named as a play on the neighborhood's nickname of Allston Rock City, due its high concentration of musicians, and as an allusion to the neighborhood's large population of rats. The festival aims to showcase Allston and Boston artists, as well as to raise awareness of the rat problem.
- Every year, Commonwheels, an Allston DIY bike organization, holds the Allston Rat Race, a cross between an alleycat race and a community festival. Entrants ride a course through the neighborhood with optional stops, each of which features a zany activity that highlights a feature of the community and encourages broader knowledge of neighborhood amenities and organizations.

== In popular culture ==
- Allston's ZIP Code "02134" is famously identified due to a recurring musical piece on the PBS children's series ZOOM, whose originating station, WGBH, was located on Western Avenue east of Allston Square until 2008.
- Big D and the Kids Table, a ska band, makes multiple references to Allston within their songs.
- Massachusetts grindcore band Anal Cunt wrote several contemptuous songs that reference Allston in a pejorative way, such as "You Live in Allston", "Everyone in Allston Should be Killed" and "I Just Saw the Gayest Guy on Earth".
- Allston contains several locations in the David Foster Wallace novel Infinite Jest and the book includes in a footnote, "PS: Allston rules!"
