= Great Scott (disambiguation) =

"Great Scott!" is an exclamation of surprise, amazement, or dismay.

Great Scott may also refer to:

- Great Scott (lunar sample), a 21-pound rock picked up on the moon by Commander David Scott of Apollo 15
- Great Scott! (TV series), an American sitcom that aired in 1992
- Great Scott (music venue), live music venue located in Allston] a neighborhood in Boston, Massachusetts
- Great Scott Township, St. Louis County, Minnesota
- The Great Scott, ring name for Canadian professional wrestler, booker and promoter George Scott
- Great Scott Films Inc, co-founded by Christopher J. Scott
- Great Scott! The Best of Jay Scott's Movie Reviews, a collection of reviews by Canadian film critic Jay Scott
- Nickname of A Greek–English Lexicon, specifically the longest editions of the work (Robert Scott is one of the co-authors)

== Music ==
- "Great Scott Rag", a 1909 composition by James Scott
- Great Scott! (1958 Shirley Scott album)
- Great Scott!!, an album by Shirley Scott released in 1964
- Great Scott! (1991 Shirley Scott album)
- Great Scott!, compilation album by Little Jimmy Scott
- Great Scott (opera), a 2015 opera by composer Jake Heggie and librettist Terrence McNally
