= Suffolk Railroad =

Former railway in Boston

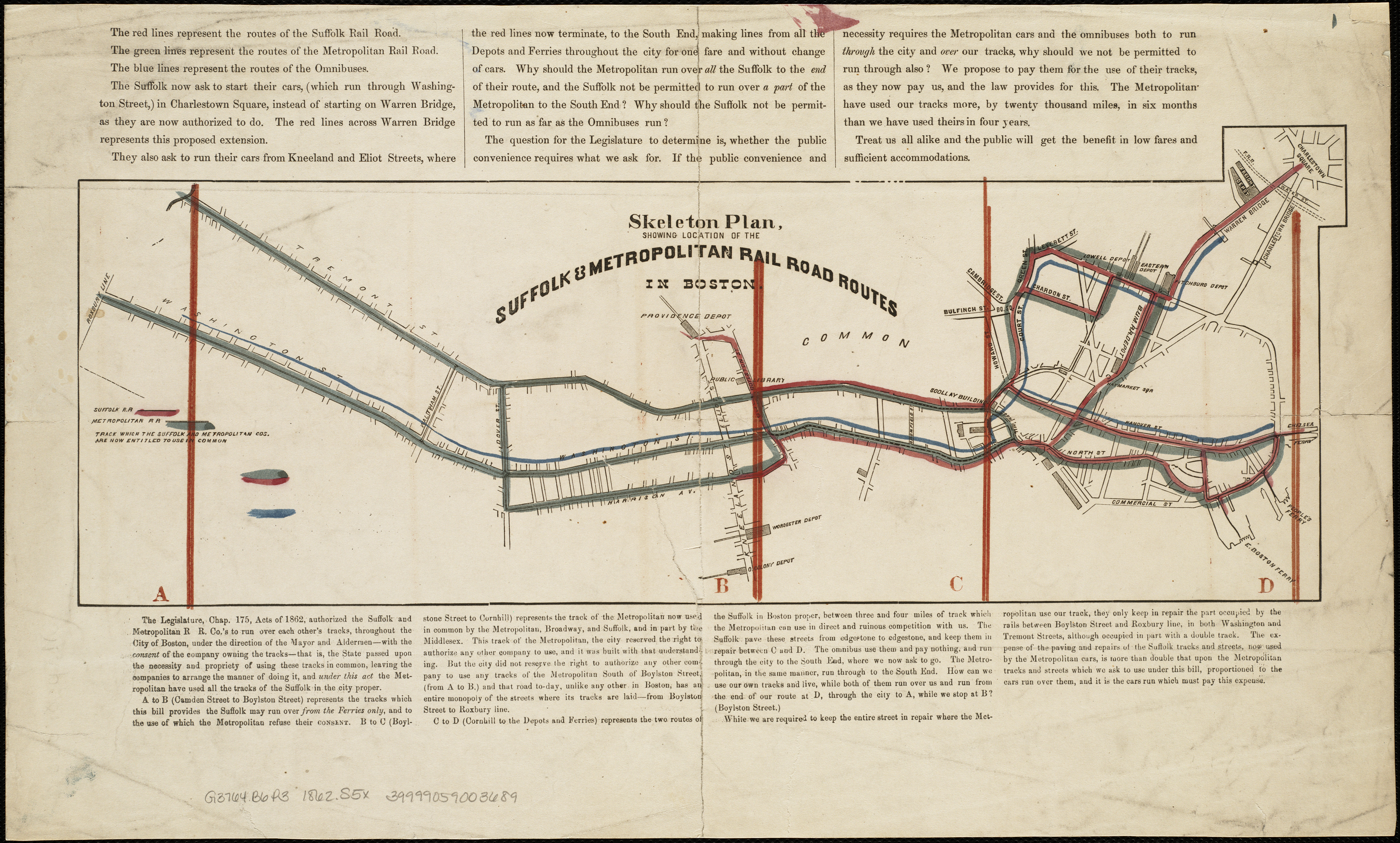
"Skeleton plan, showing location of the Suffolk & Metropolitan rail road routes in [mainland] Boston," 1862. The Suffolk was proposing here to expand its reach to Charlestown and the South End, using the tracks of the Metropolitan for the latter

The Suffolk Railroad was a street railway company that operated in Boston, Massachusetts, in the mid-nineteenth century. It provided horsecar service for passengers traveling between East Boston and Downtown Boston.

== History ==
The Suffolk Railroad was incorporated on May 30, 1857, and commenced full operations in September 1860. The company was mainly focused towards building and operating routes running in East Boston and the city mainland, using the ferries operating across Boston Harbor to transport their cars between the two areas.

The railroad was initially authorized to lay track in East Boston from the ferry wharves to Maverick Square and hence to the bridges leading to Chelsea. On the mainland, it was to run from the North End ferries to along Hanover Street as far as Scollay Square, where it would connect with the tracks of the Middlesex and Metropolitan Railroads before looping back along North, Moon, and Fleet Streets to Commercial Street. Subsequent location grants permitted service to the Northern Depots and parts of the West End, as well as down Washington and Tremont Streets as far as Boylston Street and the Boston & Providence Depot at Park Square. On the mainland side, the company had several routes that ran along the tracks of other horsecar railroads, notably the Metropolitan, and likewise its competitors were able to utilize its tracks for their own cars.

The Suffolk Railroad was acquired by the Metropolitan on July 27, 1864 for $190,000. In its final full year of operations, it had run 113,046 miles and carried 557,083 passengers.
