= Together Boston =

American electronic music and arts festival

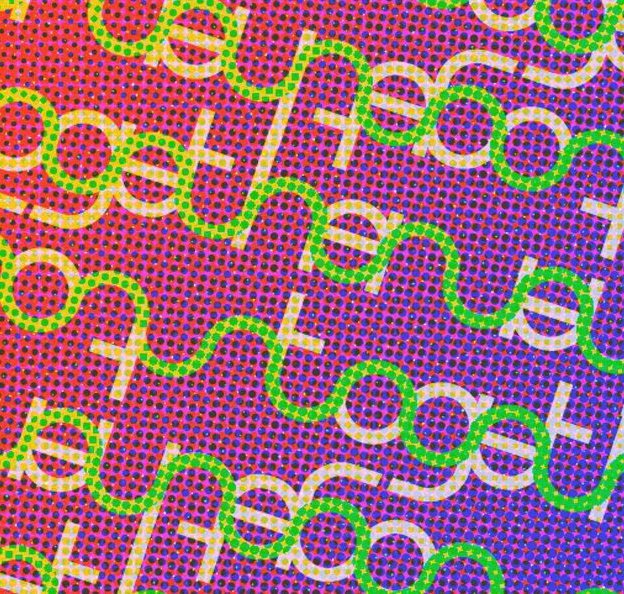
- Status: Defunct
- Genre: Music, Art and Technology
- Frequency: Annually
- Locations: Central Square, Cambridge, Massachusetts, United States
- Years active: 2010–2019
- Inaugurated: 2010
- Website: togetherboston.com (archived)

Together Boston was an annual electronic music and arts festival in Massachusetts. First held in 2010, it was a week-long program of events held across Greater Boston, including venues in Boston and Cambridge. The festival held its tenth and final event in 2019. The program included musical performances, discussions, art exhibitions, and film screenings. The festival's motto was "Music, Art, and Technology".

== Musical performances ==
Musical performances were held at venues across Boston and Cambridge, including The Sinclair, The Middle East, House of Blues Boston, Royale, Paradise, Great Scott, Middlesex Lounge, Goodlife, and Phoenix Landing. Artists appeared together for label showcases or as part of a club night roster.

== Accompanying program ==
=== Discussions and lectures ===
Demonstrations from 2012 included a drum production workshop hosted by iZotope and a panel called "Needles vs. Buttons", discussing the differences between a vinyl DJ and a digital DJ. Creative industry panels included "Beyond Ramen: Surviving as an Artist" and "War Stories from the Start-Up Front".

Panels from 2013 included a discussion on artist representation in the digital age, a panel on copyright law in the modern era, and a Q&A with meme celebrity Scumbag Steve.

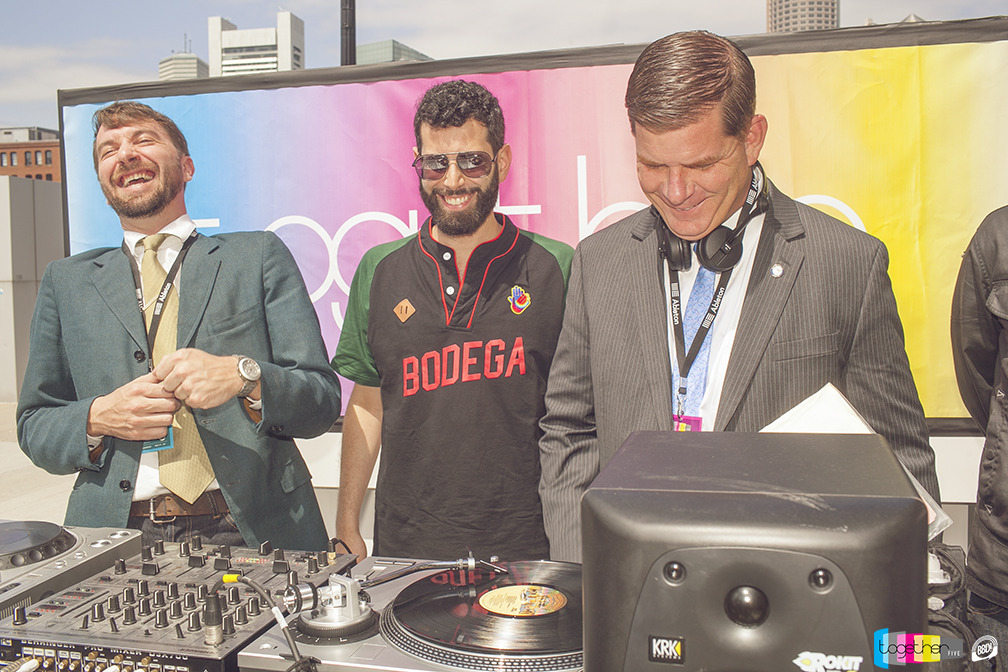
Boston Mayor Marty Walsh "Dropping the beat" at District Hall

In 2014, the daytime events expanded to two locations: the Maven Project educational program in Central Square and District Hall in Boston's Seaport District. The Recharge Lounge featured integrated live performance with Ableton and demonstrations from ToUch Performance Art.

"Together Talks" were also held at District Hall, featuring four themed days of discussion. "Community Day" featured Boston Mayor Marty Walsh "dropping the ceremonial first beat" and a discussion with Boston natives Soul Clap. "Technology Day" featured VSnap, Cadenza, and Groupmuse. "Music Day" included presentations from Harvard University, MassArt, and ethnomusicologist Wayne Marshall. "Art Day" featured presentations from the Massachusetts Institute of Technology and a segment on augmented wearable fashions from the Rhode Island School of Design.

In 2015, a large international delegation of Dutch guests from Utrecht received an official proclamation from Boston's Mayor Marty Walsh honoring Dutch contributions to international culture.

In 2016, Together Boston launched an app containing a guide to the festival week. Meetups for 2016 commenced with a discussion on the history of dance music in partnership with the Dutch government. Tech huddles were held throughout the week at the Danger Awesome tech hub. Those running the VJ Competition held a tutorial on Ableton and VJing. The record fair was hosted by producer Martyn.

=== Film screenings ===
Together Boston also screened music-related films throughout the festival week, typically at independent cinemas around Boston and Cambridge. Some films focusing on German artists were screened at Boston's Goethe Institute.

=== Get Together ===
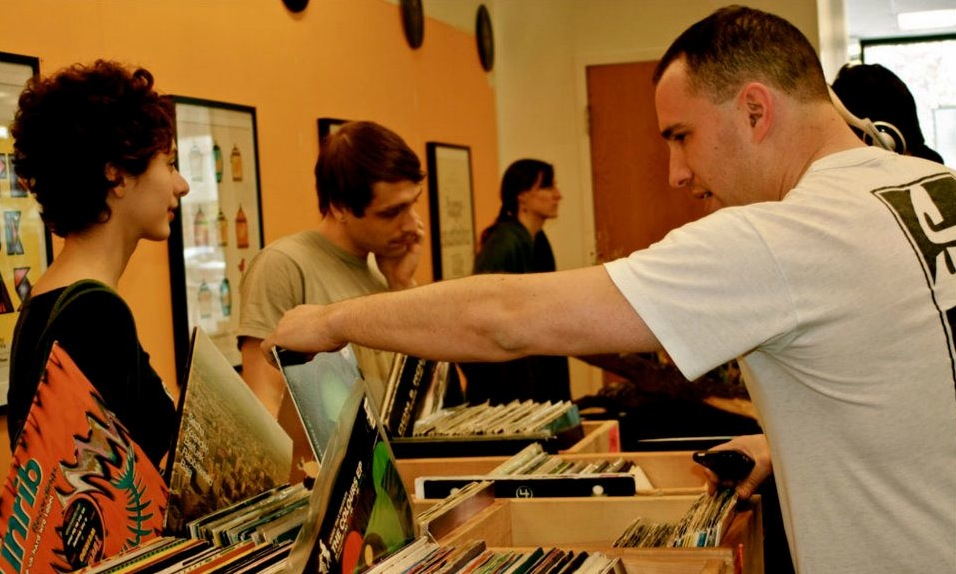
2012 Get Together

The festival also included Get Together, a daytime farmers market-style trade show, where retailers sold various products related to music culture, especially a wide range of second-hand dance music vinyl records. In 2013, Get Together moved outdoors to become the World's Fair; featuring live music, DJ stages, and local street food vendors. The Soul Clap record fair, added in 2014, became an ongoing seasonal event in Cambridge.

== Annual compilations ==
Together Boston released an annual compilation of tracks composed by Boston-based musicians, including both individual tracks and a master mix of all tracks.

In 2014, Together Boston partnered with Boston label Zakim Recordings to produce a vinyl edition of the compilation, with 6 of the tracks featured on a special-edition 12" release.

== Reception ==
In its first year, Metro Boston reported that the "reaction was positive from the community and business groups involved." In 2011, the Boston Globe reported: "With an increased focus on a slate of daytime panels, discussions, and technology demonstrations, the organizers want to engender a dialogue about music."

In 2013, Together received a lengthy review from music magazine XLR8R: "Together remains a festival by Bostonians for Bostonians, a fitting labor of love for a city in need of as much love as it can get." The Boston Globe said that "This year’s programming further emphasizes the art and technology aspects of Together’s larger mission." The following year, the Globe wrote: "The focus of the week is not just music, but also the art and technology that make Boston such a thriving, creative place to live at the moment." The same year, Fact Magazine said "Together Boston was described as rapidly positioning itself as one of the United States’ best events for forward-thinking music."

In 2014, before dropping the ceremonial "first beat" of the festival, Boston Mayor Marty Walsh said that "Lineups like these garner national and international attention, which helps us strengthen Boston's reputation as a cultural destination." International music magazine Resident Advisor gave the festival a 4.5 out of 5-star review in 2014. "Together showed what a dedicated community can accomplish even with factors like that stacked against it, and it made the city seem vibrant, fun, and hungry for good music."

In November 2014, Together Boston was awarded "Best Festival in Boston" by The Boston Calendar.
