= Leather District =

Coordinates: 42.3506°N 71.0574°W

- U.S. National Register of Historic Places
- U.S. Historic district
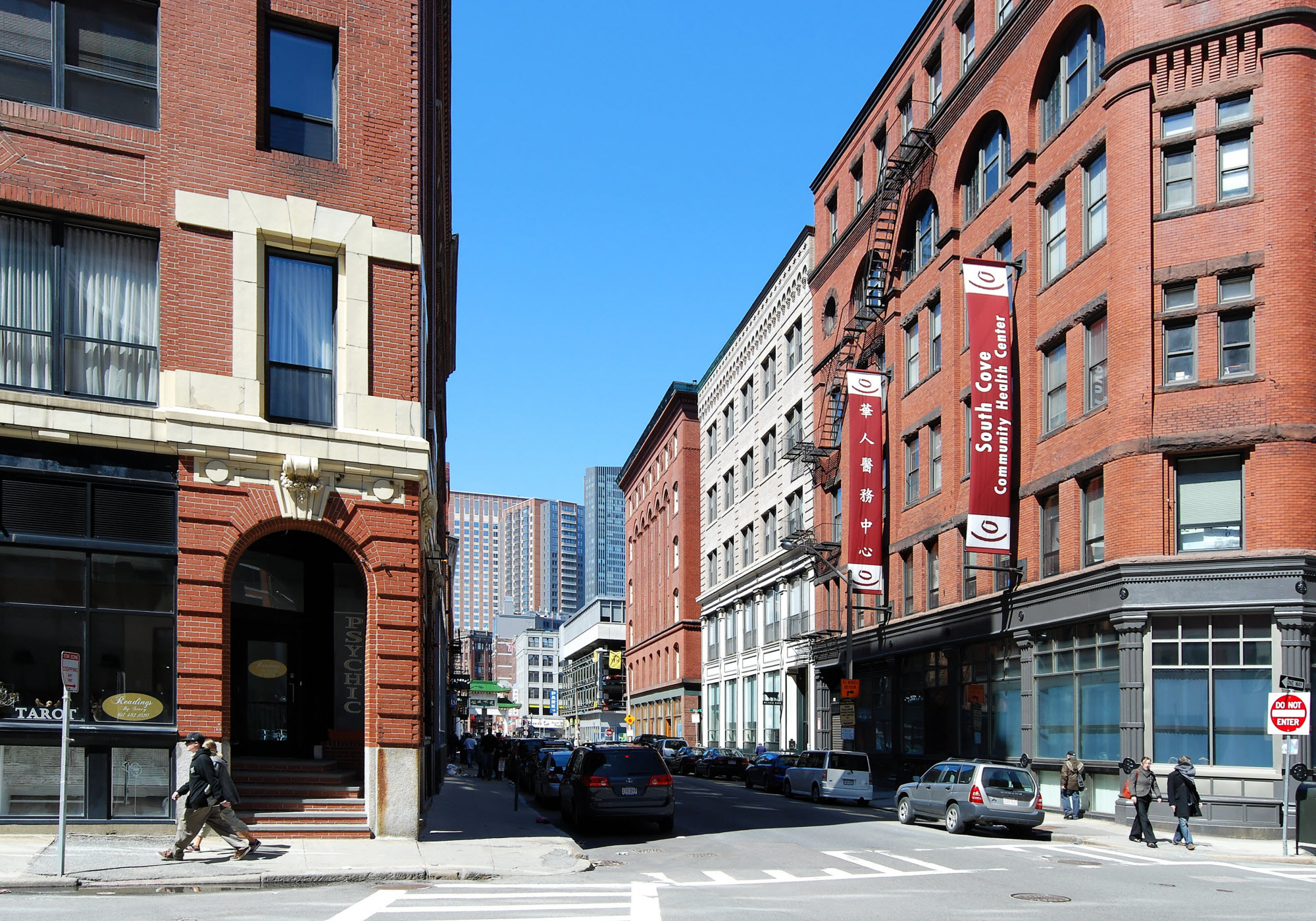
- Corner of South Street & Beach Street
- Location: Boston, MA
- Built: 1883
- Architect: Multiple
- Architectural style: Classical Revival, Romanesque
- NRHP reference No.: 83004098
- Added to NRHP: December 21, 1983

The Leather District is a neighborhood of Boston near South Street, between the Financial District and Chinatown. The Leather District (occasionally referred to as the "LD") is a tightly defined area bounded by Kneeland Street to the south, Essex Street to the north, Atlantic Avenue to the east and Lincoln Street to the west. It is so named due to the dominance of the leather industry in the late 19th century.

== History ==
The district did not exist until Boston's land-making expansions filled in the former South Cove during the 1830s, making way for the development of this area as well as Chinatown. It was at first developed as a residential area, but became the center of the city's leather industry after the Great Boston Fire of 1872, which devastated the city's business district and led to the introduction of stringent commercial fire codes. The buildings constructed in this district between the 1880s and 1920 reflect these constraints, and the needs of the leather manufacturers to efficiently use their spaces. Ground floors were designed to showcase merchandise, and the second floors housed offices. Upper floors were used for storage, the top floors being reserved for the slowest-moving merchandise.

Many of the buildings were designed by architects, notably including Peabody and Stearns and Willard T. Sears, with a significant influence of the Richardsonian Romanesque style. The district is the most homogeneous 19th-century commercial district in the city, and was listed on the National Register of Historic Places in 1983.

== See also ==
- National Register of Historic Places listings in northern Boston
