= Parkway, Boston =

Coordinates: 42.29°N 71.14°W

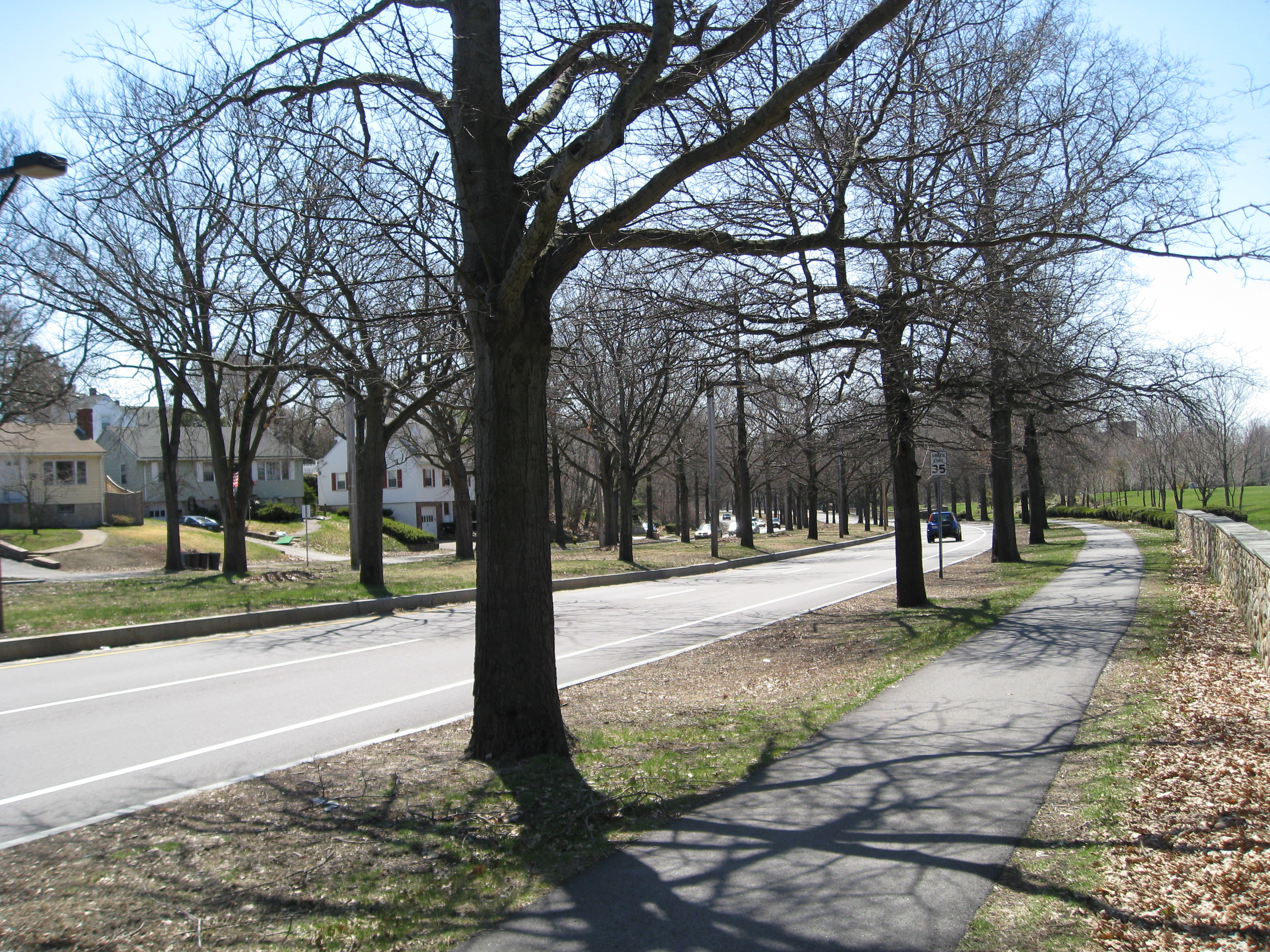
VFW Parkway, West Roxbury

Parkway is a section of the West Roxbury and Roslindale neighborhoods of Boston, Massachusetts. Parkway takes its name from the parkways that pass through West Roxbury, specifically West Roxbury Parkway (constructed 1919 - 1929) and VFW Parkway (constructed 1930 - 1942). Much of the land that makes up Parkway was once owned by the Weld family, as evidenced by Weld Street that runs through the area.

As illustrated on the Boston Redevelopment Authority neighborhood map of 1967, Parkway is roughly bounded by (clockwise, from north) Allandale Street, the Arnold Arboretum, South Street, Washington Street, Corinth Street, Belgrade Avenue, West Roxbury Parkway, Centre Street, Church Street, and the Brookline, Massachusetts line.

== Notable residents ==
- Daniel F. "Bud" Roche, co-founder of Roche Bros. Supermarkets.

== Sites of interest ==
- Allandale Woods

== Transportation ==
- Roslindale Village (MBTA station)
- Bellevue (MBTA station)

== See also ==
- Neighborhoods in Boston, Massachusetts
