= Central Square, East Boston =

Neighborhood in Massachusetts, US

Coordinates: 42.3771°N 71.0401°W

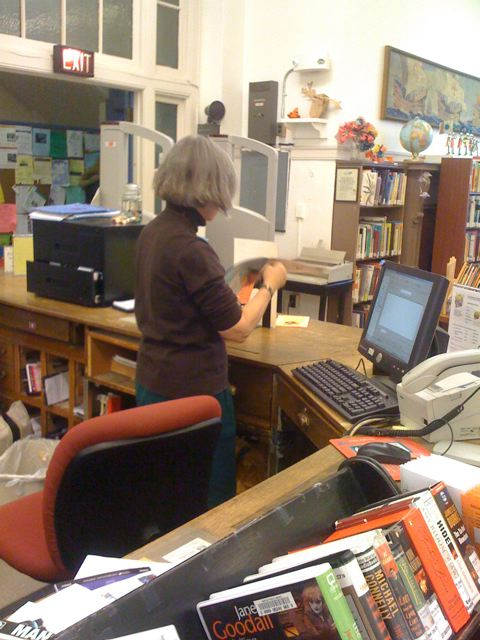
Librarian at work in the East Boston branch of the Boston Public Library

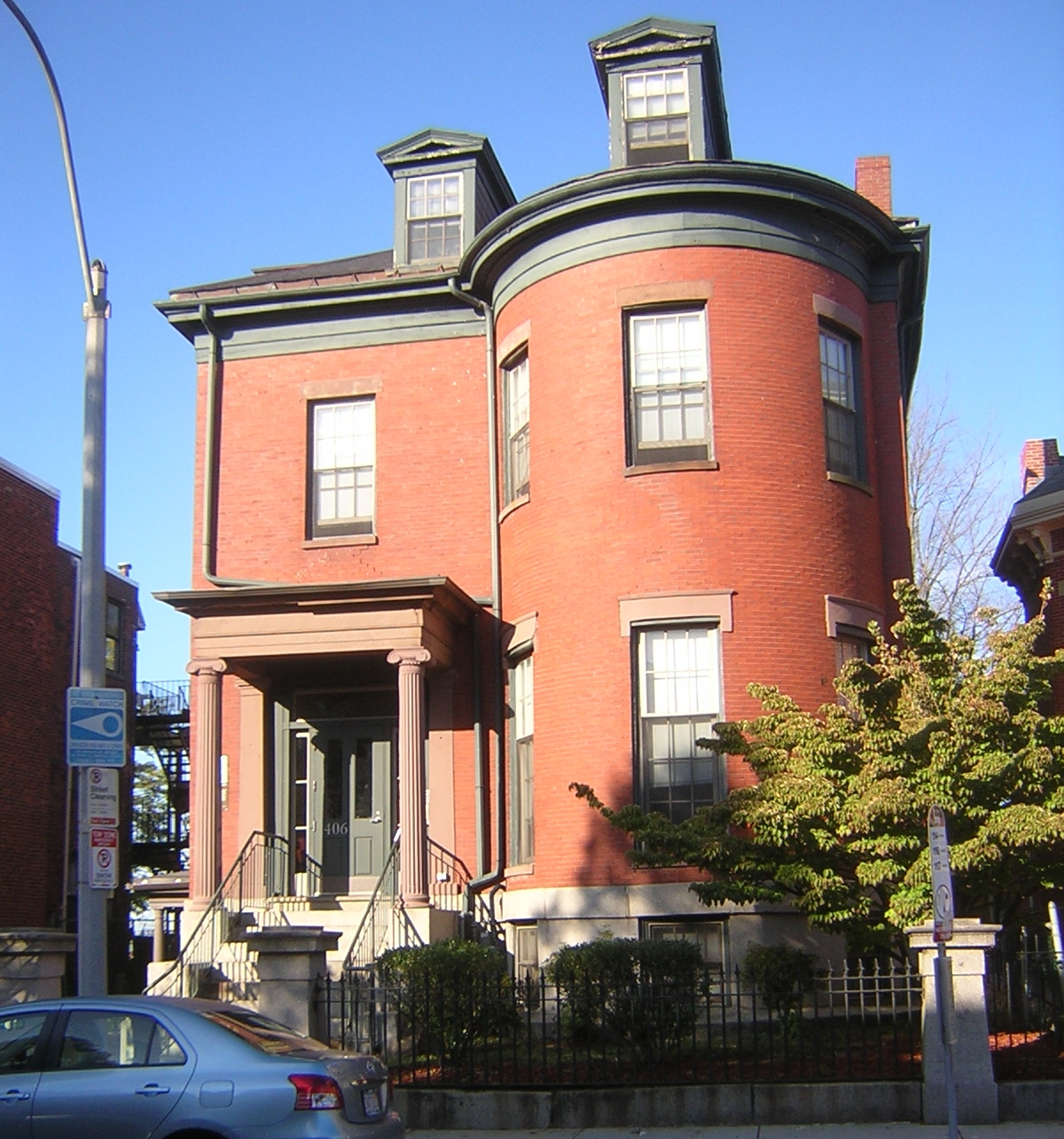
The Trinity Neighborhood House located at 406 Meridian Street

Central Square is a section of the neighborhood of East Boston in Boston, Massachusetts, United States. The square begins at the intersection of Bennington Street and Meridian Street, continues up Meridian to its intersection with White Street, and includes all the area to the left. The square's intersecting streets also include Border, Saratoga, and Eutaw Street. It is within close proximity of the entrance to the Sumner Tunnel, which motorists take to downtown Boston.

== Education ==
The Mario Umana Middle School Academy is the only school within the confines of Central Square, located at 312 Border Street. It is part of the Boston Public Schools system. Notably, the school's campus features the only recognized skate park in the neighborhood, the Harborside Community Skatepark. The first public branch library in the United States, built in 1870, lies in Central Square. Boston Public Library's East Boston branch is located at 276 Meridian Street.

== Sites of interest ==
=== Italia Unita festival ===
Central Square is the site of the annual Italia Unita festival, where the square is closed off for festivities. Live bands play and food carts serve the crowds.

=== Liberty Plaza ===
The Lombardo family invested heavily to create a shopping district in Central Square. They began with a function hall named Lombardo's Function Facility and expanded to create what is now called Liberty Plaza, the square's strip mall. They expanded with a large supermarket, Liberty Market. In 2000, the family moved their business to Randolph, but the shopping plaza is still active and vibrant. The entrance to the Plaza features a small park, known as Bertulli Park or Central Square Park, which doubles as a rotary. Today, stores include CVS Pharmacy, Marshalls, Sprint, AutoZone, Shaw's Supermarket, including eateries such as McDonald's and Pollo Campero.

=== Trinity Neighborhood House ===
The Trinity Neighborhood House is a historic brick townhouse at 406 Meridian Street. Since 1888, it operated as a social service center and philanthropy of Trinity Church. In 1966, the House was taken over by the East Boston Social Centers. Today, it has been converted into Section 8 housing for the disabled and formerly homeless. In 1981, the Boston Landmarks Commission declared it a landmark and it was later added to the National Register of Historic Places in 1992.

== See also ==
- Day Square
- Maverick Square
- Orient Heights
