= Packard's Corner =

Major intersection in Boston, Massachusetts

Coordinates: 42°21′7.51″N 71°7′29″W

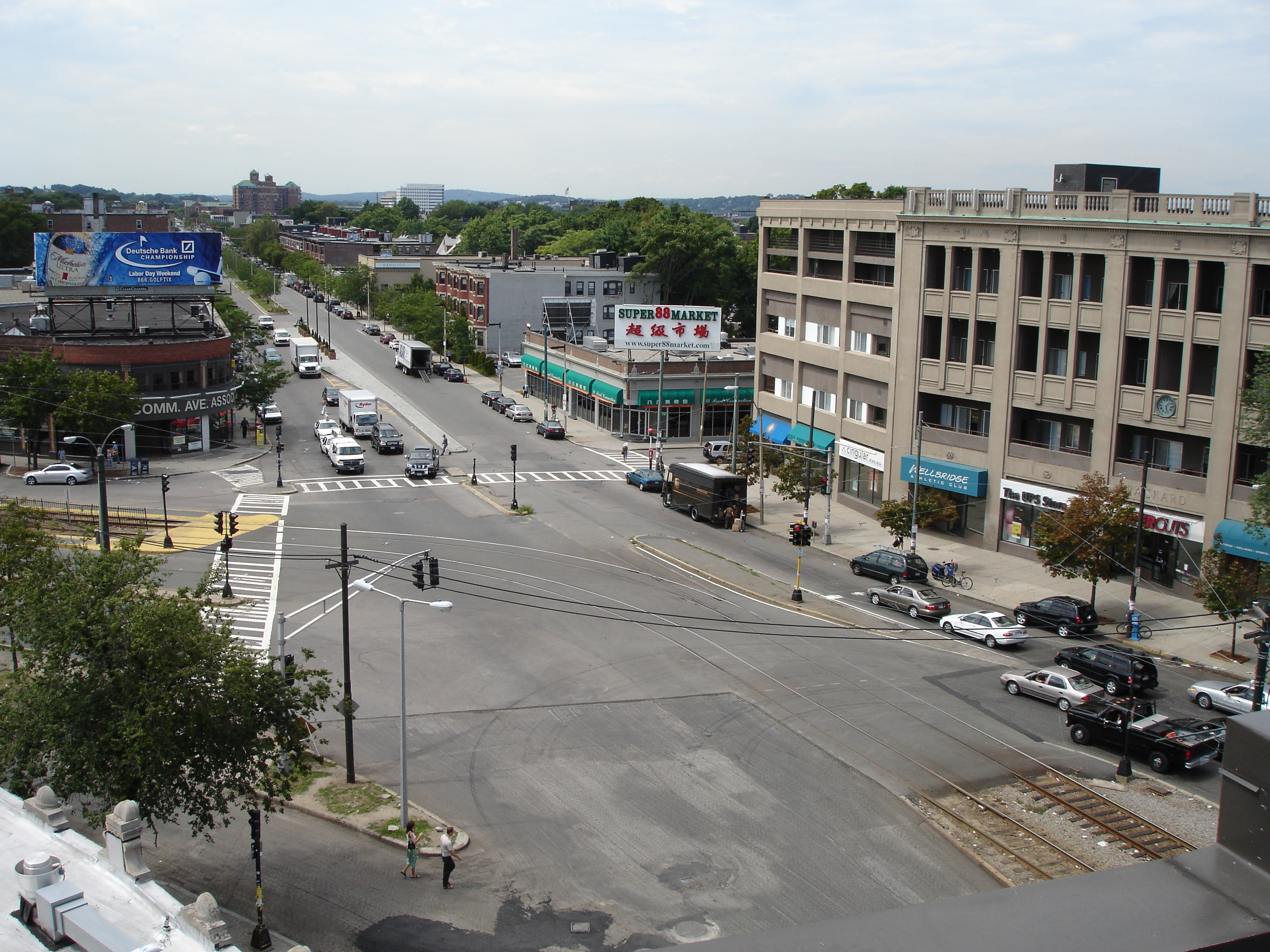
A bird's eye view of Packard's Corner facing away from downtown Boston

Packard's Corner is located in Boston, Massachusetts at the intersection of Commonwealth Avenue and Brighton Avenue. Packard's Corner is serviced by the Packards Corner stop on the B branch of the MBTA's Green Line, a light rail line that runs mostly above ground.

According to the Brighton Allston Historical Society, the name comes from a livery yard, Packard's Sales Stable and Riding School, which existed in the area from 1885 through 1920, and was perpetuated by a Packard automobile dealership that was built by Alvan T. Fuller circa 1910.

The former A branch once forked with the B line at Packard's Corner where the A line continued onto Brighton Avenue towards Allston's Union Square.
