= Christopher J. Scott =

America theater and television producer

Christopher J. Scott is a television, film and theater producer. He lives in New York City.

== Career ==
He started his career in 1994 as a production coordinator with CBS. He then worked as a production manager and line producer with USA Networks and The Sci-Fi Channel. Scott later became a flagship employee for converging new media and entertainment agencies in the 90's including Razorfish and Modern Media/Poppee Tyson.

=== Ignition Point Studios ===
Scott started Ignition Point Studios, a film and television production company. As co-founder and Director, Scott registered $3.1 million in sales and continued to manage film and television projects for top clients including New Line Cinema, CBS, Sony, Calvin Klein, BBDO, PBS, USA Networks, GT Direct and Arista Records.

Additionally, Scott and Ignition Point were nominated for an Emmy for the PBS documentary Desi.

=== Red Sky Pictures ===
Scott was a co-founder/partner in the production company Red Sky Pictures, additionally serving as a writer and director. Projects include TV series A Moment of Luxury, Retail Therapy, Hip Hop Hold Em, and the independent feature films Falling Star and Staten Island.

=== Great Scott Films ===
Christopher and his brother Glen L. Scott launched Great Scott Films, Inc., a NYC production and post production company. In its first eighteen months it accumulated over 2.5 million in sales, launched a PBS series and began production on its second feature film. In addition, GSF is launching a documentary series MTV.

== Films and documentaries ==
He made the 2006 festival short film You and I” (2006 Cannes Film Festival). He made national spots for clients including Hasbro, ESPN, International Baseball Federation, Major League Baseball, National Geographic, Grey Advertising, Bayer and Juvederm. In addition, he wrote and directed the documentary Snow Blind.

Scott was a producer of the 2010 film Escape to Donegal.

== Controversy ==
In 2010 Scott and his partners suddenly closed the off-broadway play Manigma starring Tony Award winner Michael Aronov.

The New York Times reported, "Despite an acclaimed performance and strong ticket sales, 'Manigma' closed four weeks early when promised investor funds never arrived. 'The only smile on my face these days is when I’m up there,' Mr. Aronov said, heading into what was suddenly his closing week".

Scott's representatives replied "Although the play had a prior successful run that created a lot of enthusiasm, this did not translate to a bigger stage at that time. The best decision was made to avoid any future losses. There was nothing but respect for the producers and talent and it was failure on our part to get the right backing 'Manigma' sincerely needed".
