= German International School Boston =

Location
- 57 Holton Street Boston, MA 02134; United States; 42.3604°N 71.1361°W

Information
- Established: 2001; 25 years ago
- Grades: Preschool, K–12
- Enrollment: >300
- Website: www.gisbos.org

German International School Boston (GISB) is a private, bilingual (German/English), international school in Boston, Massachusetts. This German school abroad (Deutsche Auslandsschule) was established in 2001 and officially inaugurated by Former German President Johannes Rau. The School's name changed from “German School Boston” to “German International School Boston.” The school moved to its current location in 2006. It serves over 300 students, starting from age 2.9 for preschool through grade 12. Students who complete the program receive the German International Abitur and a high school diploma.

In 2011, the Bundesverwaltungsamt (BVA) recognized GISB as an Exzellente Auslandsschule (German School Abroad of Excellence), the highest accreditation level awarded. GISB is recognized locally as an Affiliate Member of the Association of Independent Schools of New England. In the 2015–2016 school year, GISB was recognized as a STEM-friendly School and became part of a network of German schools with a STEM focus. In 2023, the school announced it's plans to expand. They secured a longterm lease at 46 Belmont St. in Watertown, MA. After renovations, the Lower Campus opened for the 2025-2026 academic year.

The school experienced rapid leadership changes after long-term Head of School Holger Wirtz completed his tenure in mid-2024. Dr. Johannes Schwehm then took over the position on August 1, 2024, but served only briefly before stepping down during the 2025–2026 academic year. Assistant Head of School Funda Suzan stepped in as Interim Head of School to guide the institution through the transition until incoming leader Philipp Kraft assumed the role in the summer of 2026.

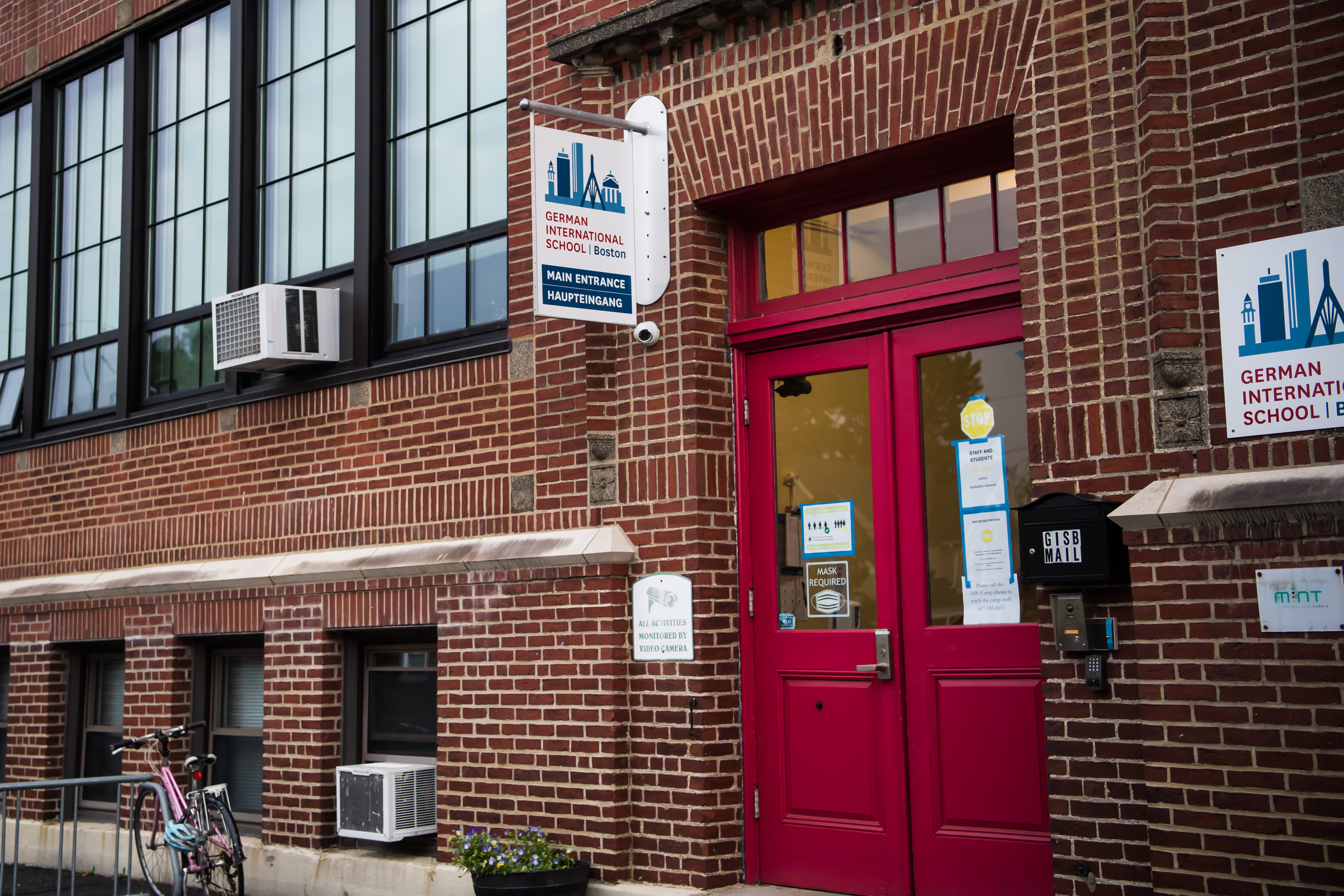
Front Entrance of German International School

== See also ==
- Bonn International School, an Anglo-American school in Bonn formed by the merger of two American schools and one British school
- German American
