= Day Square =

Coordinates: 42.3787°N 71.0287°W

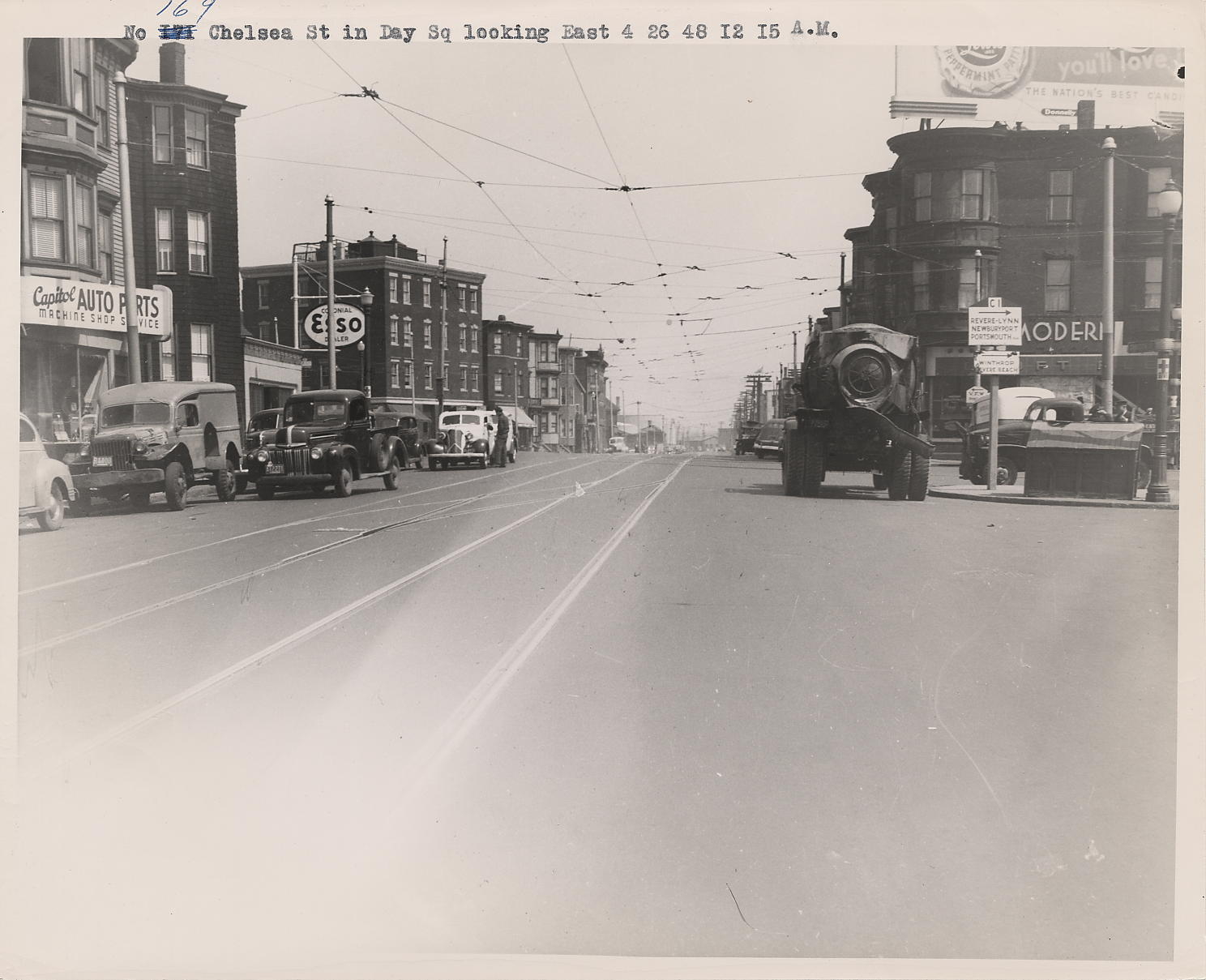
Chelsea Street at Day Square looking east, April 26, 1948

Day Square is a section of the neighborhood of East Boston in Boston, Massachusetts, United States. The square consists of the area surrounding the intersection of Bennington Street and Chelsea Street. It is one of the neighborhood's larger and more active business districts with a number of stores, services, and restaurants.

== Education ==
The Patrick J. Kennedy Elementary School and its playground is situated at the northwestern corner boundary of Day Square. It is located at 343 Saratoga Street and is the only school within the Square's limits.

== Restaurants ==
Day Square is home to the oldest Italian restaurant in Boston, Jeveli's Restaurant, which was established in 1924. The restaurant claims to serve on average over 250,000 people a year. Their menu features typical Italian-American cuisine including various types of pasta, barbecue, and seafood. A short walk away, at 280 Bennington Street, is Spinelli's Function Facility, another Italian eatery, which offers dining and catering for special occasions and parties. Established in 1983, this location in Day Square is the original location of the dining facility, which now has a location in Lynnfield, Massachusetts.

The Square also features establishments with other ethnic cuisine such as Chinese (Great Chef) and Latin American experiences such as the Salvadoran La Frontera and the Colombian La Chiva.

== See also ==
- Central Square
- Maverick Square
- Orient Heights
