= Great Scott (music venue) =

Music venue in Boston

Coordinates: 42.355277°N 71.132942°W

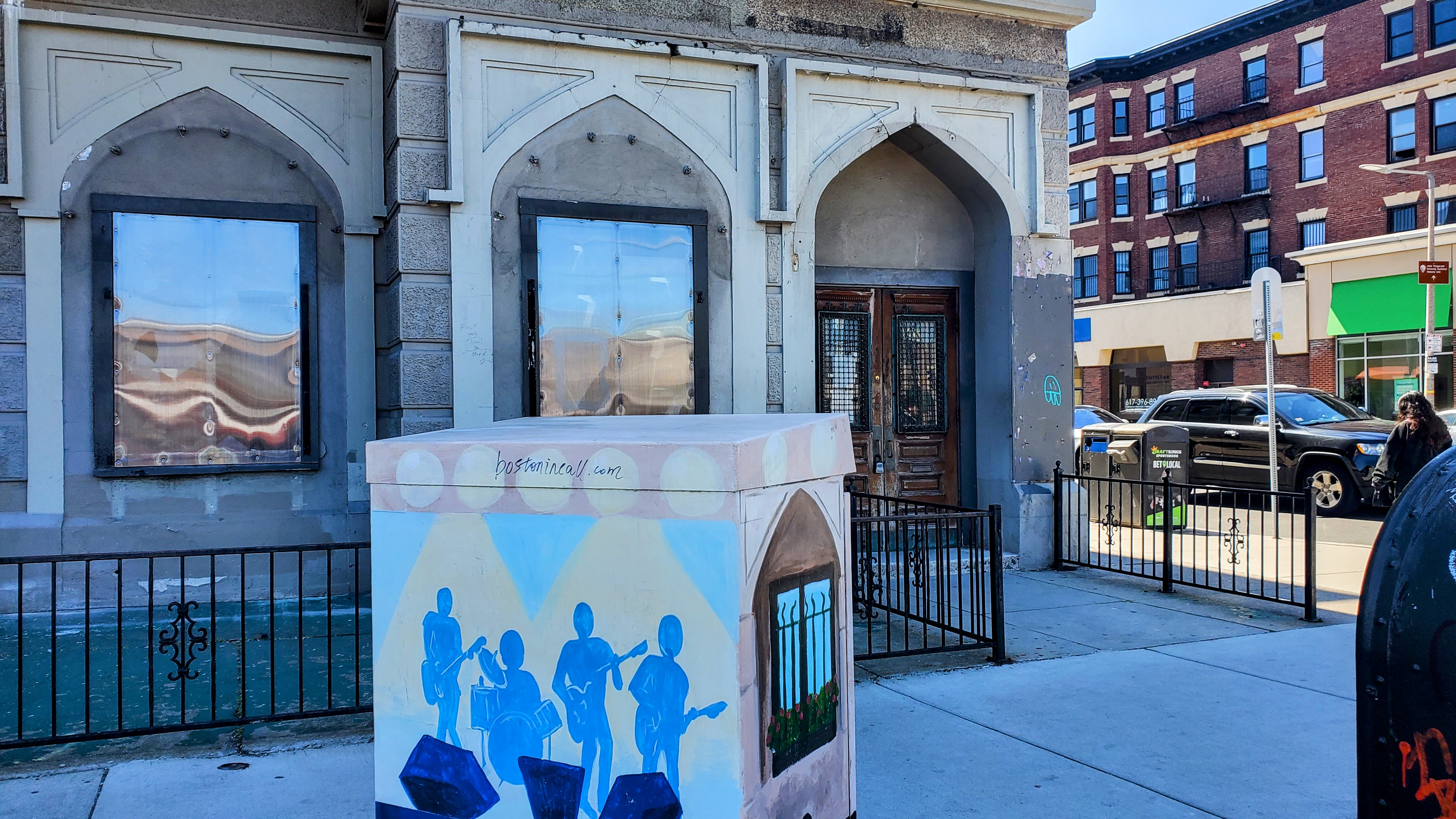
- Former site of Great Scott at 1222 Commonwealth Ave.
- Interactive map of Great Scott (music venue)
- Address: 1 Harvard Ave; Boston, MA; United States
- Capacity: 300

Construction
- Opened: 1976

Website
- Official website

Great Scott is a live music venue located in Allston, a neighborhood in Boston, Massachusetts, United States. The small venue first opened in 1976 and has featured many well-known musical acts in their early careers, such as MGMT, Charli XCX, Black Midi and Beach Bunny. In May 2020, Great Scott announced its closing amidst nationwide shutdowns caused by the COVID-19 pandemic. In July 2024, they announced they would reopen in a new location in 2026.

== History ==
Great Scott opened in 1976 as a local blues bar at 1222 Commonwealth Ave. Early contributors sought to create a venue to serve the greater Boston music scene. By the late 1980s, the space had transitioned into a popular college bar, attracting students from nearby colleges such as Boston University and Boston College. During the week, the venue featured themed events such as DJ nights, jam bands, and open mics. In 1996, Tim Philbin became General Manager and eventually began booking local indie bands to play Great Scott. By the early 2000s, the dive bar was transformed into a seven-nights-a-week music venue.

When Carl Lavin became the venue's talent buyer in 2003, Great Scott became a popular location for varying music scenes in Boston. Under Lavin, Great Scott started hosting "the pill", a weekly indie dance night, attracting small bands and attendees. This demand eventually allowed Great Scott to host bigger names and attract bigger crowds.

In March 2020, Great Scott was forced to indefinitely pause programming because of the COVID-19 pandemic. On May 1, 2020, Tim Philbin, manager of the venue, announced on their Facebook page that they would not reopen after the pandemic, writing "From... its emergence as one of the best live music venues in the city, Great Scott has meant many things to many people." A Taco Bell Cantina was opened in its place.

== Reopening ==
Shortly after Great Scott closed, a crowdfunding campaign was launched to help save the venue, receiving over 25,000 signatures and raising more than $300,000. On July 30, 2024, Great Scott officially announced its reopening on Facebook, revealing that former talent buyer Carl Lavin, along with Paul Armstrong (CEO of Redefined, the company behind the Boston Music Awards and Vanyaland) and developer Jordan Warshaw (principal of The Noannet Group), had entered into an agreement to purchase the property at the intersection of Harvard Ave and Cambridge St in Allston, close to its original location. The money raised through the crowdfunding campaign went toward developing the new space. Nearby “sister club” O’Brien’s Pub was also acquired by the team, with plans to renovate the venue and operate it in collaboration with Great Scott. The new Great Scott would feature a 300-person capacity and a wide range of performances, including local and national acts, dance nights, comedy showcases, and other community events.

On December 5, 2024, the developers filed a letter of intent for a mixed-use building featuring Great Scott on the ground floor. On April 10, 2025, the Boston Planning & Development Agency (BPDA) Board approved the project, and on September 9, 2025, it received final approval from the Zoning Board of Appeal (ZBA).

== Significance ==
In 2016, Great Scott was ranked eighth in Consequence's "100 Greatest American Music Venues."

== Notable acts ==
- Charli XCX
- Phoebe Bridgers
- Clairo
- Vundabar
- MGMT
- Beach Bunny (band)
- Jack Harlow
- Grimes
