= Union Square, Boston =

Coordinates: 42°21′13.4″N 71°8′11.8″W

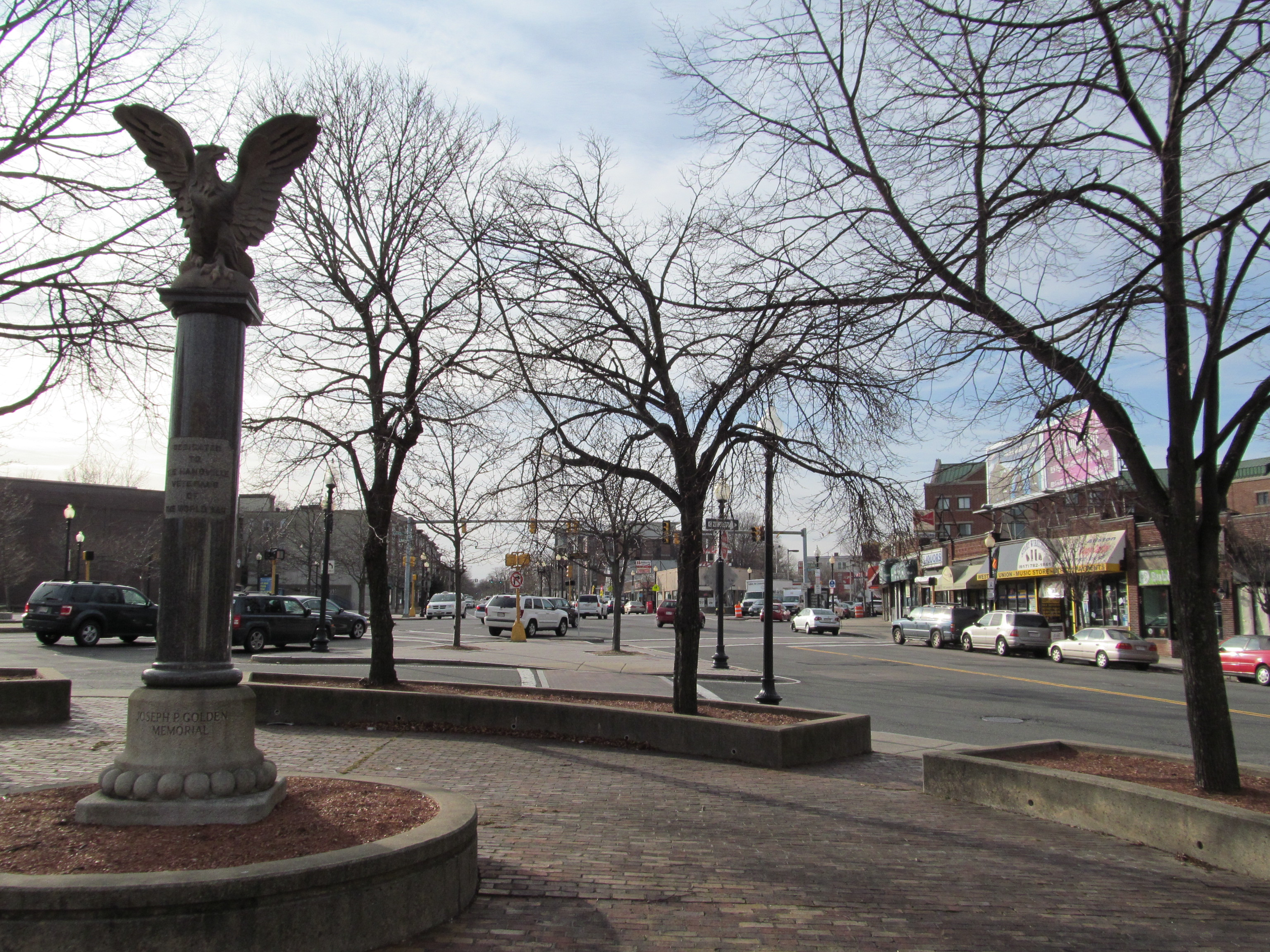
View west towards Cambridge Street

Union Square is a square in the Allston neighborhood of Boston, Massachusetts at the intersection of Cambridge Street and Brighton Avenue/North Beacon Street. Union Square is serviced by the MBTA 57, 64, 66, 501, and 503 buses. There is also a station for the Blue Bikes bicycle sharing system in Union Square.
