= Maverick Square =

Coordinates: 42°22′11.18″N 71°02′20.90″W

Maverick Square is a section of the neighborhood of East Boston in Boston, Massachusetts, United States. It is East Boston's oldest commercial center. At the heart of the square is Maverick Station, which is part of the Blue Line of the MBTA. The square is named after Samuel Maverick, one of the earliest colonists of the Massachusetts Bay Colony.

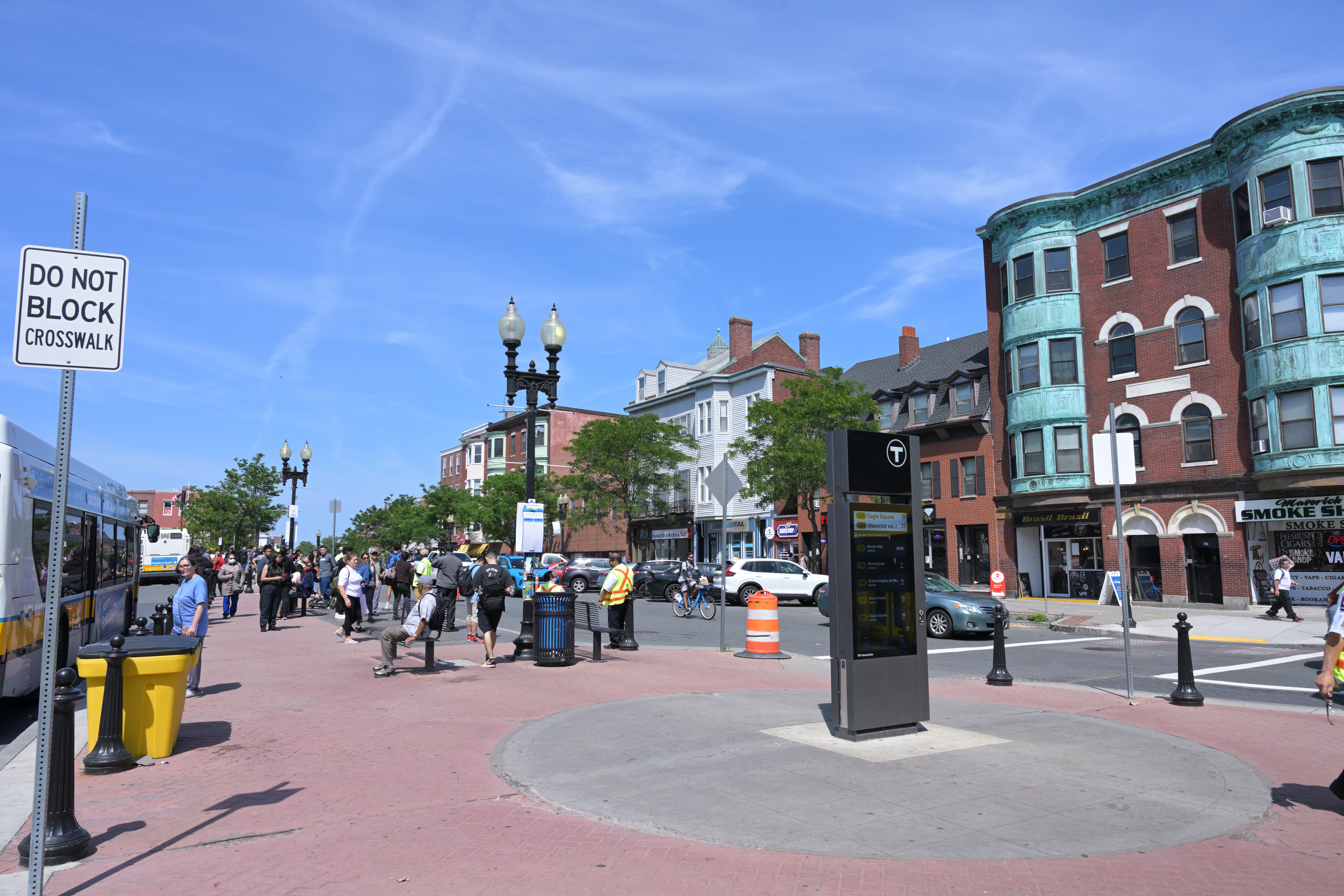
Maverick Square looking northeast

Maverick Square occupies land that was originally part of Noddle's Island. In 1833, General William H. Sumner and other investors formed the East Boston Company to develop the island for residential and industrial use; steam ferry service began from Maverick Square to Rowe's Wharf on the mainland of Boston. To encourage tourism, the Company built a wharf and the Maverick House, an 80-room luxury hotel (1835). In 1840, the Cunard transatlantic mail service established its terminus at the East Boston wharf. By the 1850s, the waterfront had become a hub of shipbuilding, with various industries and warehouses along the water's edge, while Maverick Square became the neighborhood's commercial and banking center.

Continuing into the late 19th and early 20th centuries, Maverick Square functioned as a central commercial hub for East Boston. In recent decades, however, parts of the neighborhood faced challenges such as housing issues and crime, leading to revitalization efforts in the 21st century.

The Maverick public housing project, formerly a source of high crime rates, underwent significant redevelopment. Trinity Financial and the East Boston Community Development Corporation led the redesign, which included the demolition of outdated high-rise buildings, and constructing new individual homes with private access. These efforts were part of the broader revitalization of Maverick Square, which made improvements in safety, cleanliness, and vibrancy in the general neighborhood.

In 2010, a revitalization of Maverick Square began. It involved a $56 million renovation of the Maverick MBTA Station, and a $24 million building for the East Boston Neighborhood Health Center (now NeighborHealth), located at 20 Maverick Square. The 49,000 square-foot facility opened in 2012, significantly expanding medical care in the neighborhood.

== Historic buildings ==
- 1835-1837 Fettyplace - Thorndike House (47 Maverick Square)
- 1835 Joshua Pollard House (33 Maverick Square)

== See also ==
- Central Square
- Day Square
- Maverick (MBTA station)
- Maverick National Bank
- Orient Heights
