= Pat Bartevian =

American businessperson

- Born: September 23, 1923 (age 103)

Patricia Bartevian (born September 23, 1923) is an American businessperson and author. She played an important role in having an area of Boston named Edgar Allan Poe Square after the poet and having a statue (Poe Returning to Boston) commissioned. She established the Edgar Allan Poe Foundation of Boston in 2010.

== Early life ==
Bartevian was born in 1923 to Armenian immigrant Gregory (Krikor) Bartevian (1886–1983) and Massachusetts native Vera May Retan (1893–1987).

She attended Underwood Elementary School, Bigelow Middle School and Newton High School. She and her sister, Priscilla (1925–2006), graduated from Emerson College in Boston in 1944. In the 1940s, during their time in California, the duo were known in Hollywood as the "Hickory Sisters" and were signed to McConkey Music Corporation.

== Career ==
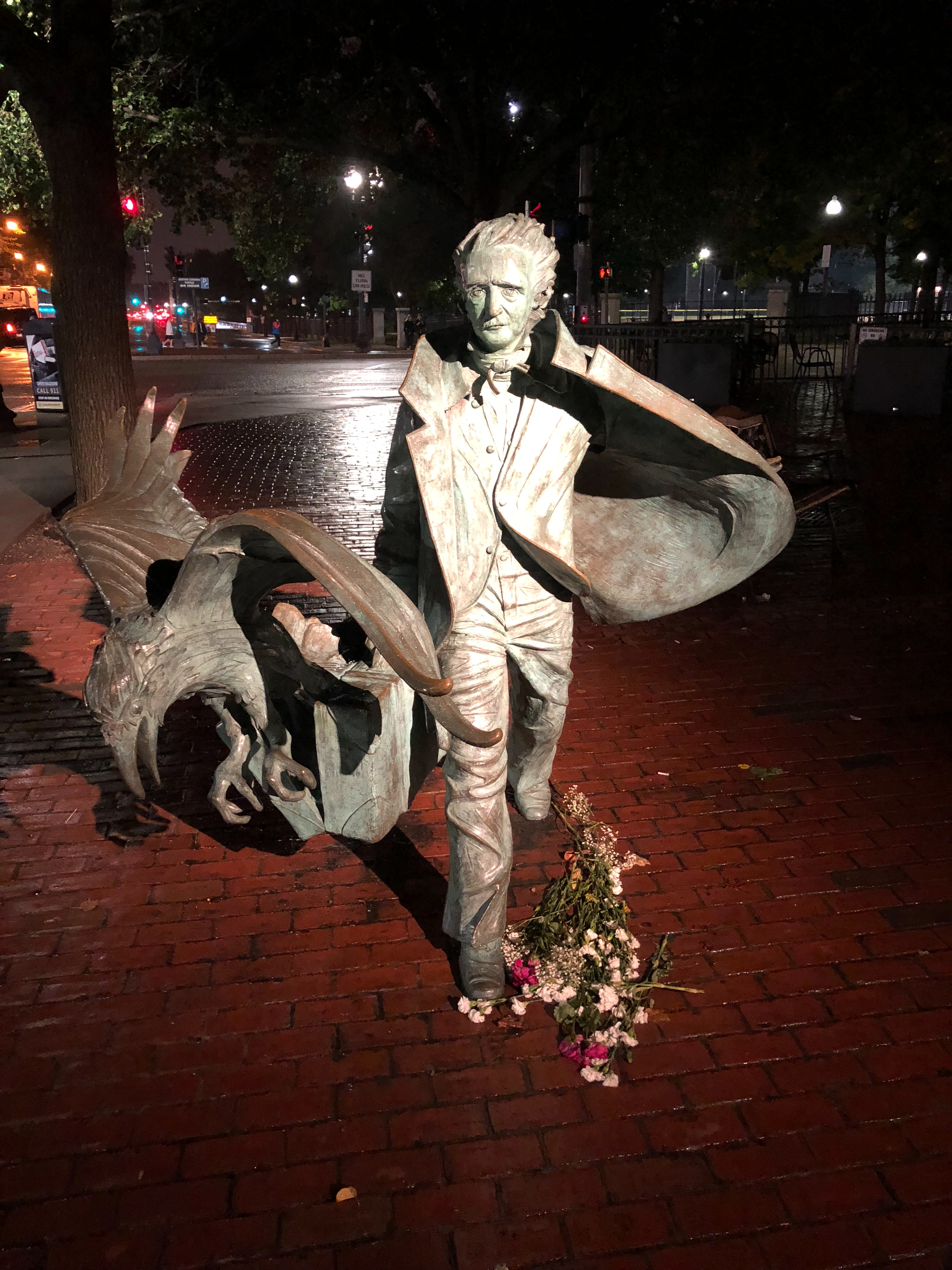
Poe Returning to Boston, 2018

Her consignment store, Bartevian Inc., on Boylston Street, Boston, was established by her father in 1910. He had fled his homeland in the Ottoman Empire to avoid death at the hands of the Turks, and sailed from Liverpool to Boston in 1905. Patricia's parents met in the shop, her mother having been working at Atlantic Monthly down the street. In 1922, Gregory was also running Colonial Antique Oriental Company at 151 Charles Street.

The Hickory Sisters returned to Boston from California in the 1970s, as their father approached 100, and took over his business.

In 2010, the sisters established the Edgar Allan Poe Foundation of Boston, headquartered on the second floor of the shop at 160 Boylston Street. After the 2014 installation of the statue of Edgar Allan Poe near their store, the sisters began selling Poe memorabilia, with the proceeds being put toward the maintenance of the statue. The statue, life-size and made of bronze, was named Poe Returning to Boston. It was sculpted by Stefanie Rocknak.

In 2021, she published The Bartevians: A Boston Family, a history of a family of Armenian descent from 1900 to 2021. She also co-wrote Who Were the Hickory Sisters with her sister in 2012.

As of 2025, Bartevian still traveled to her store, from her home in Newton, six days a week.

== Bibliography ==
- Who Were the Hickory Sisters (2012) ISBN 979-8303059191
- The Bartevians: A Boston Family (2021) ISBN 9798985757606
