= Bay Village, Boston =

Coordinates: 42.3491°N 71.068°W

Bay Village
- Neighborhood of Boston
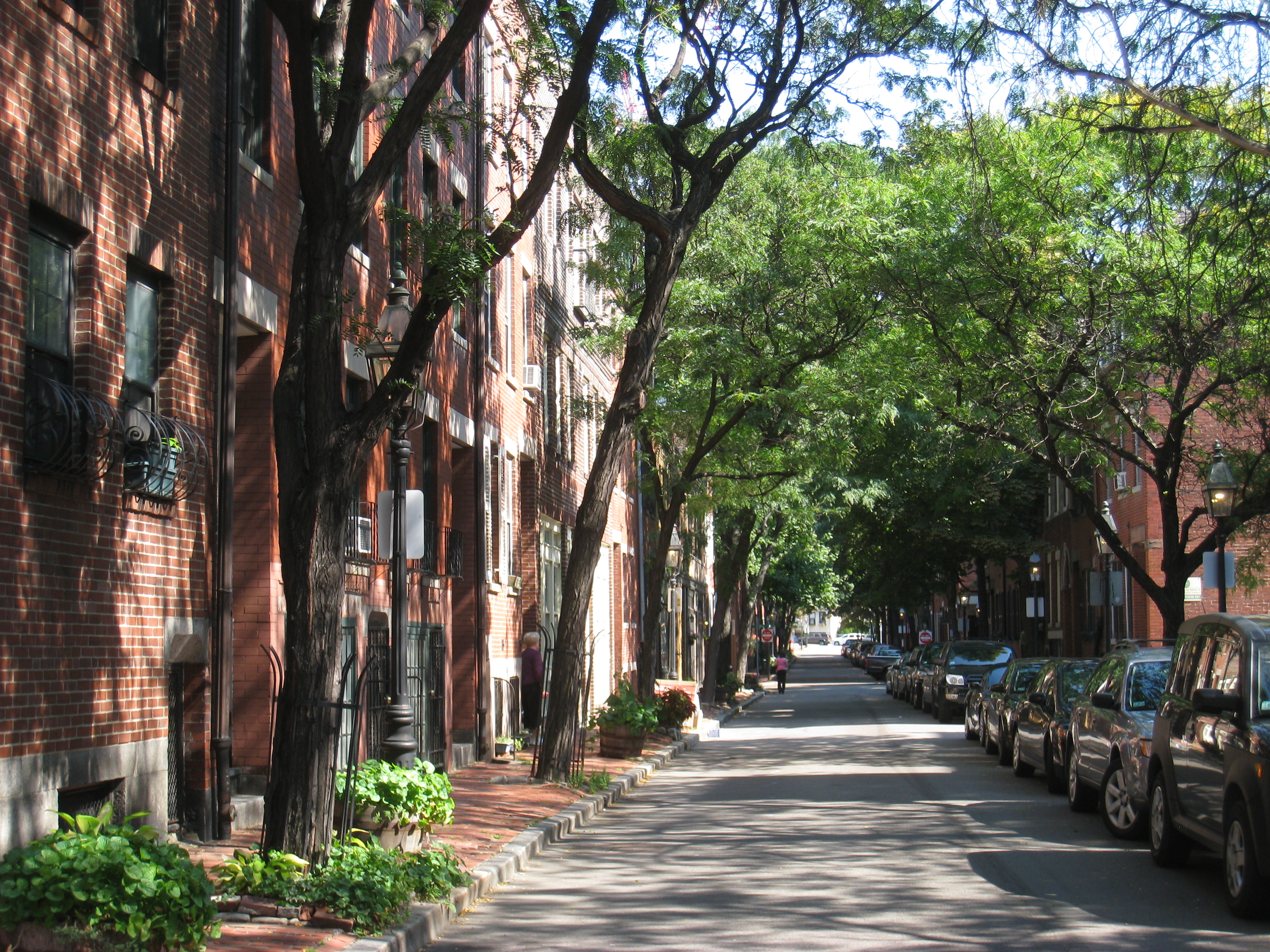
- Bay Village, Boston
- Interactive map of Bay Village
- Country: United States
- State: Massachusetts
- County: Suffolk
- Neighborhood of: Boston

Population (2010)
  - Total: 1,312
- Time zone: UTC-5 (Eastern)
- Zip Code: 02116
- Area code: 617 / 857
- Website: www.bayvillage.net

Boston Landmark
- Designated: March 22, 1983

Bay Village is the smallest officially recognized neighborhood of Boston, Massachusetts, United States. As of 2010, its population was approximately 1,312 residents living in 837 housing units, most of which are small brick rowhouses.

== Description ==
The Massachusetts Turnpike is the southern boundary of the neighborhood, which coincides with the right-of-way of the former Boston and Worcester Railroad, laid down in the 1830s. Marginal Road and Cortes Street are the surface roads that parallel "the Pike". Across the Pike to the southwest lies the South End neighborhood; to the southeast of the Pike and Tremont Street is the southern edge of Chinatown. To the west of Berkeley Street and north of Columbus Avenue (west of Arlington Street) is the Back Bay neighborhood. To the north of Stuart Street is Park Square, and to the east of Charles Street is the Washington Street Theatre District.

In 1983, the area bounded by Cortes Street, Tremont Street, Piedmont Street, and Isabella Street was designated as the "Bay Village Historic District" by the Boston Landmarks Commission. The exterior appearance of buildings is protected by a Historic District designation administered by the Bay Village Historic District Commission.

The narrow one-way network and irregular grid arrangement of the streets make the interior urban spaces of Bay Village relatively quiet and pedestrian-friendly, due to sparse automobile traffic. Most of the sidewalks are paved with brick, and are lit by gas streetlamps at night. One small street is still paved with original cobblestones, while the remainder have long ago been repaved with asphalt.

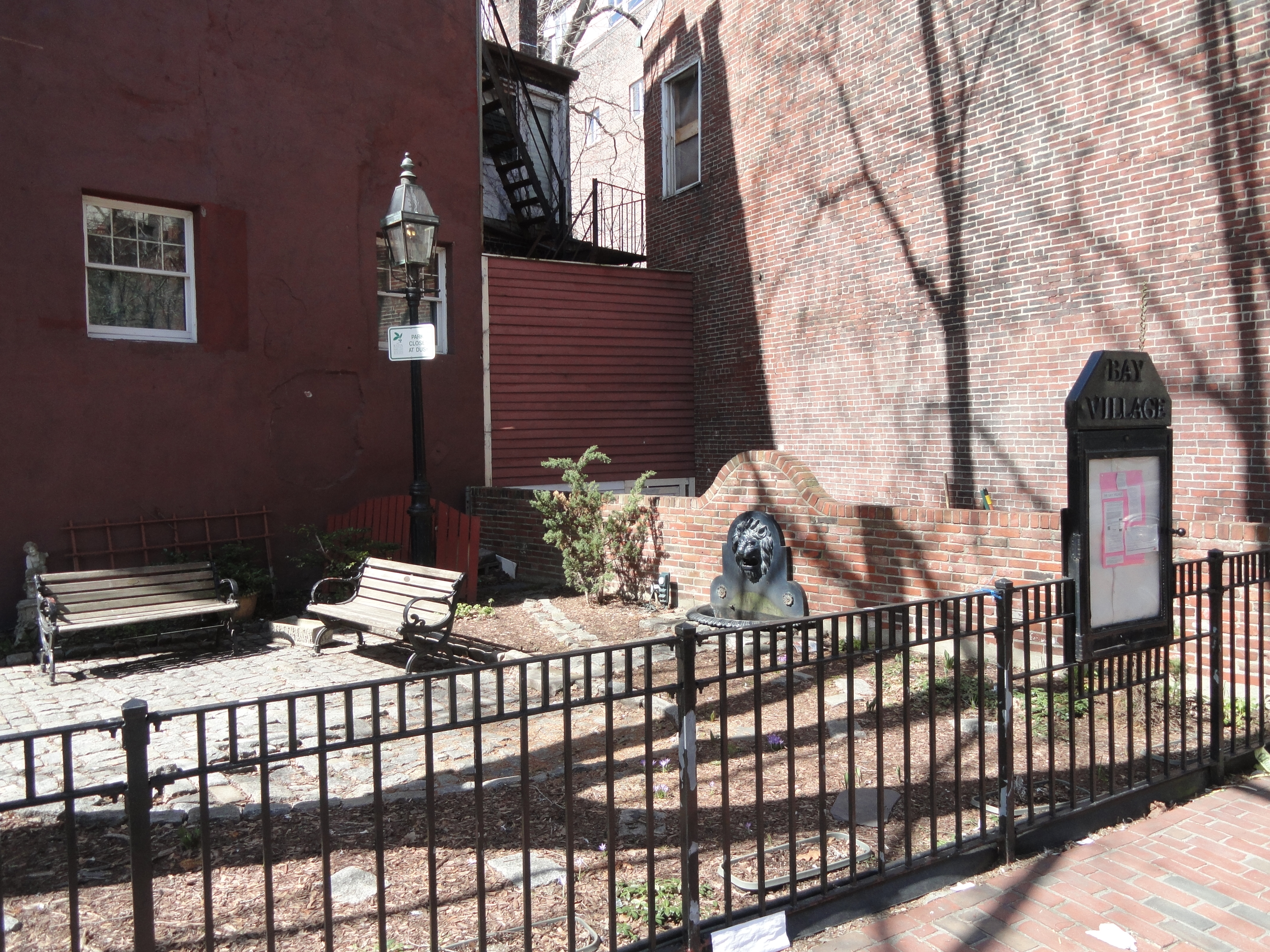
A Bay Village "vest-pocket park"

There are a few "vest-pocket parks" located within or nearby Bay Village, including Eliot Norton Park, which although technically located in the Theatre District, is just across Charles Street from the eastern boundary of the neighborhood. The Boston Public Garden and Boston Common are located just two blocks away from the northern edge of Bay Village.

Traditionally middle to lower-middle class, the neighborhood has become relatively more expensive and upscale, beginning around the 1990s. The Bay Village Neighborhood Association (BVNA) is very active in controlling urban nuisances, such as traffic, litter, graffiti, and pet wastes (an approved dog walking area is located next to Eliot Norton Park). The BVNA is also known for organizing Spring and Fall Cleanup days, a book club, Christmas wreaths and decorations, a Halloween celebration, and the Bay Village Annual Neighborhood Block Party. The party includes banquet table seating in the middle of a narrow closed street, weather permitting.

== History ==
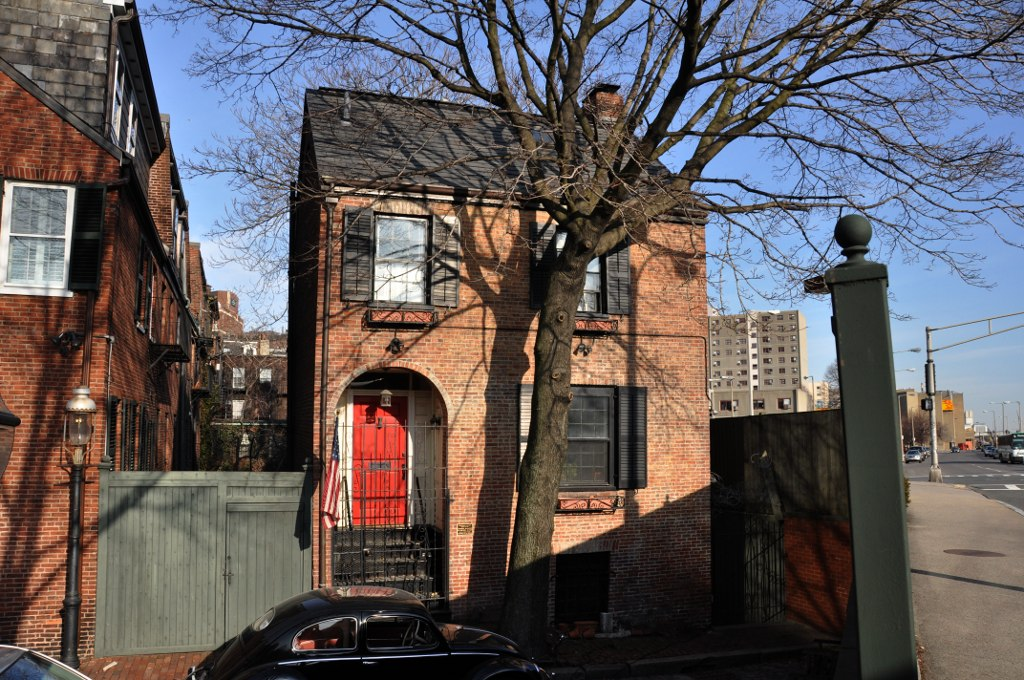
The House at 1 Bay Street, an 1830 house listed on the National Register of Historic Places (NRHP)

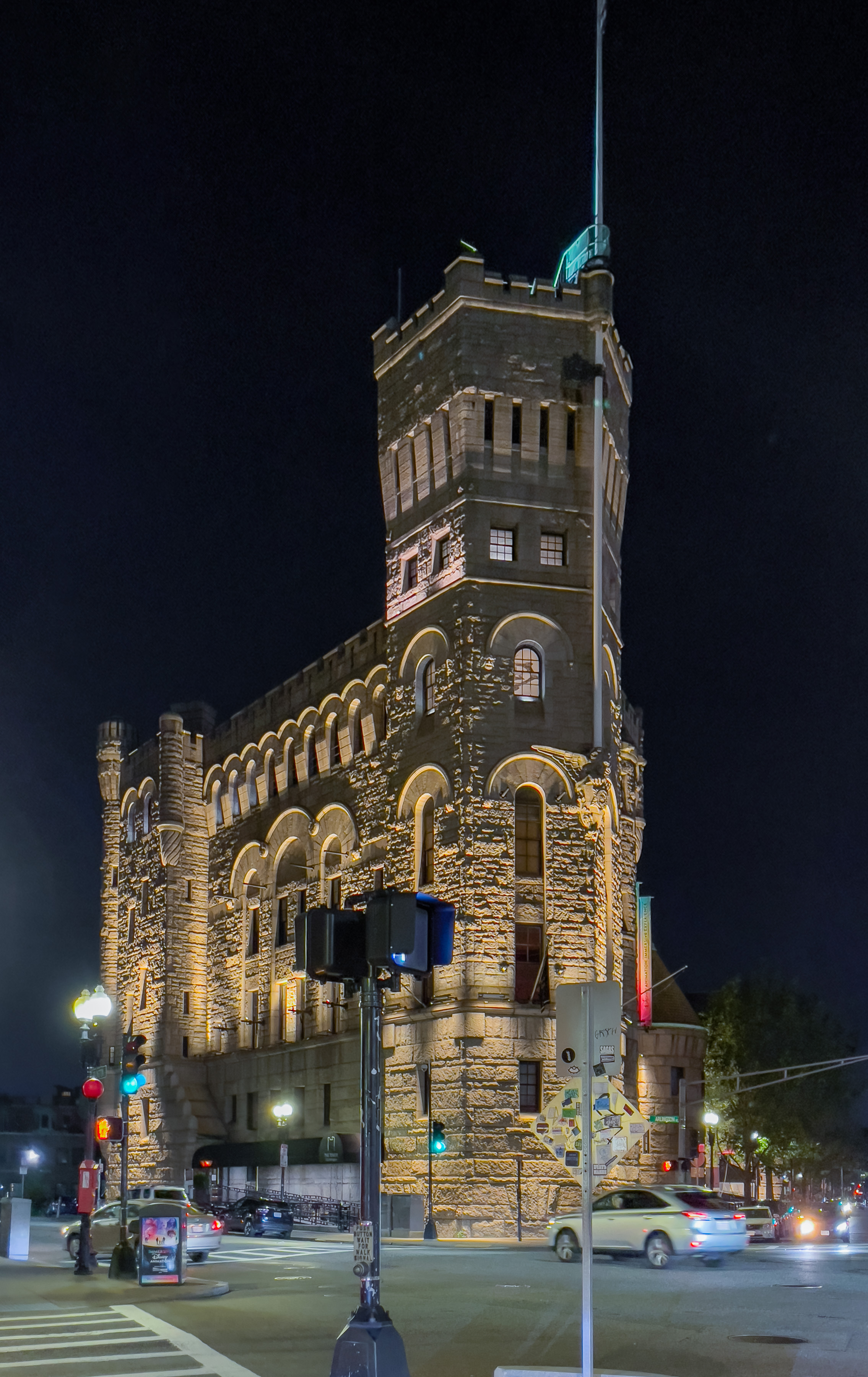
The old armory on Arlington Street

The western part of the neighborhood was originally part of the body of water known as the Back Bay, west of the Boston Neck isthmus. This area was once known as South Bay, as the original waterline was in the area of Charles Street and Broadway (formerly Carver Street and Pleasant Street). In the 1820s, the neighborhood was landfilled by developer Ephraim Marsh, in partnership with Francis Cabot Lowell Jr, before the more extensive landfills of the adjacent Back Bay and South End neighborhoods. Through its history, the neighborhood has been known at different times as the Church Street District, South Cove, and Kerry Village.

Architecturally, many Bay Village homes look like smaller versions of Beacon Hill townhouses. This is largely because many of the craftspeople who built the Beacon Hill residences settled in this area and built the local residences for their own use. Fayette Street, named for the American Revolutionary War soldier Marquis de Lafayette, has numerous houses dating from the Federal Period. Grander five-story townhouses in the Greek Revival style may be found on Melrose Street. After the area west of Ferdinand Street was filled in, developers built luxury residential "hotels" in the Victorian style on Cortes and Isabella Streets.

=== Raising the Village ===
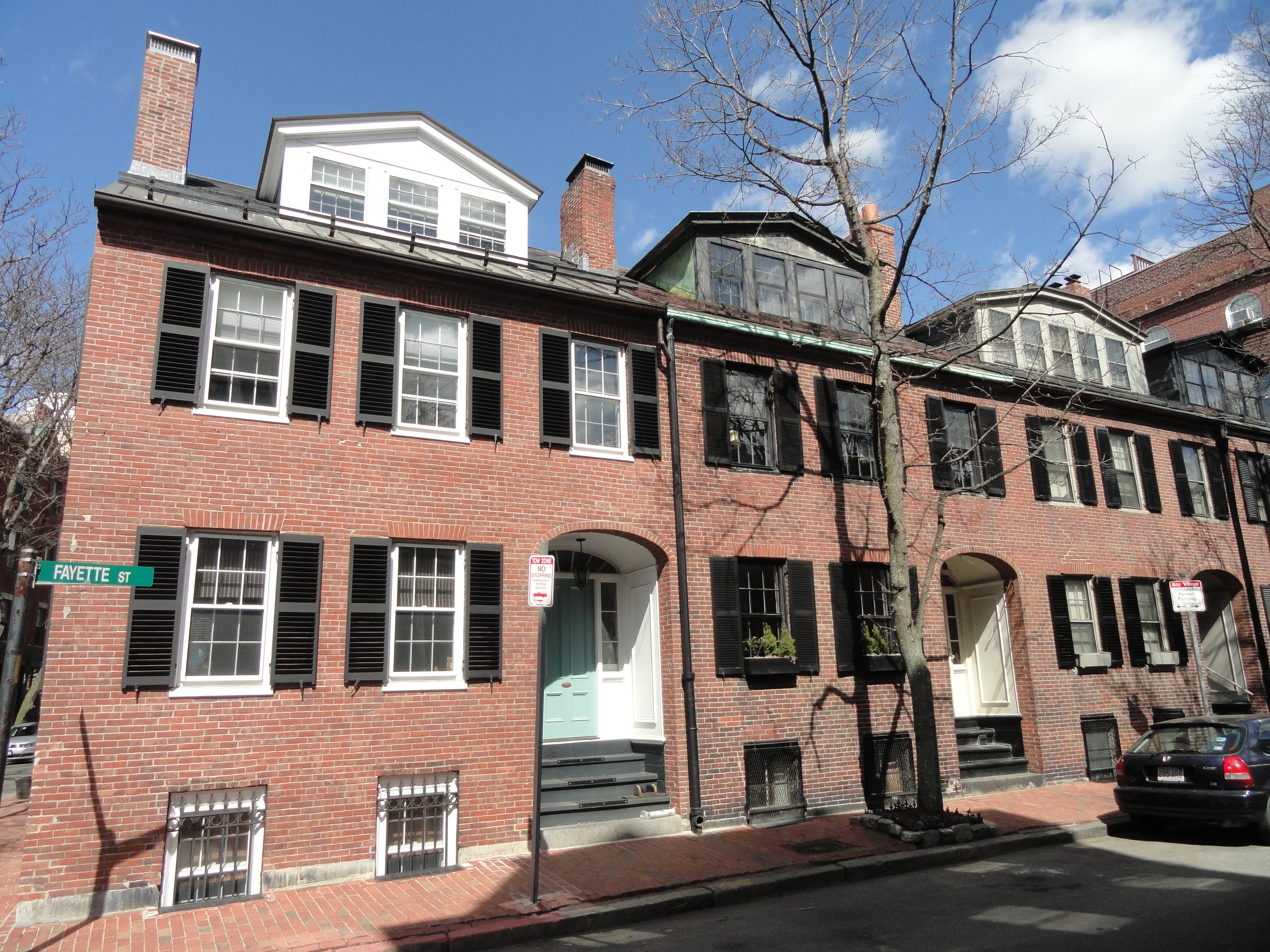
Federalist-style townhouses which were elevated after original construction

In 1868, the majority of what is now Bay Village was raised in order to eliminate sewage problems created by the filling of the adjacent South End and Back Bay neighborhoods. Some 457 houses and 24 other structures were raised by 12 feet (3.7 m) to a grade of 18 feet (5.5 m) above mean low water, with cellars, gardens and vacant lots raised to 6 feet (1.8 m) above mean low water. The total cost of this massive engineering feat was $632,700, compared to a total estimated value of $1,668,120 for all of the structures raised. To complete the work, the City of Boston temporarily took possession of all the structures in the area, exchanging them for City bonds with the property owners. There were 3,528 displaced individuals in total, coming from 867 families, and the work took around two years to complete. Once the structures and streets were raised, and the new sewer system was functional, the structures were returned to the property owners.

Many of the raised structures were modified with new entrances into what had previously been the second floor. Visitors can see evidence of this today by noting the location of the basement windows in some of the buildings on Fayette Street, as well as arches opening to horsewalks that ran under the houses to stables in the rear. In addition, some private gardens were never raised, and remain near their original elevations. The Church Street Church, for which Church street was named, was raised and "much altered by 1868 (at the time of the raising of the district)." The church, which was located between the current Winchester and Piedmont Streets, was later demolished in 1924.

Raising the Village (1868)

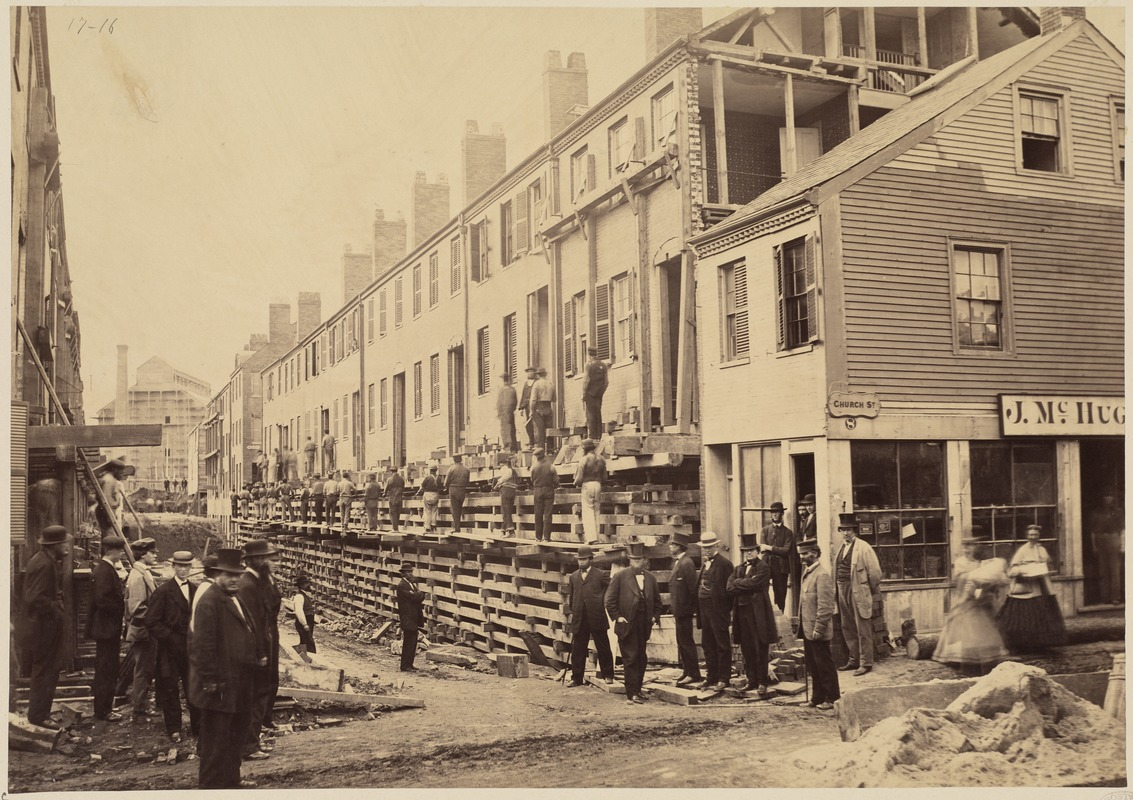
Houses on north side of Fayette Street, west of Church Street

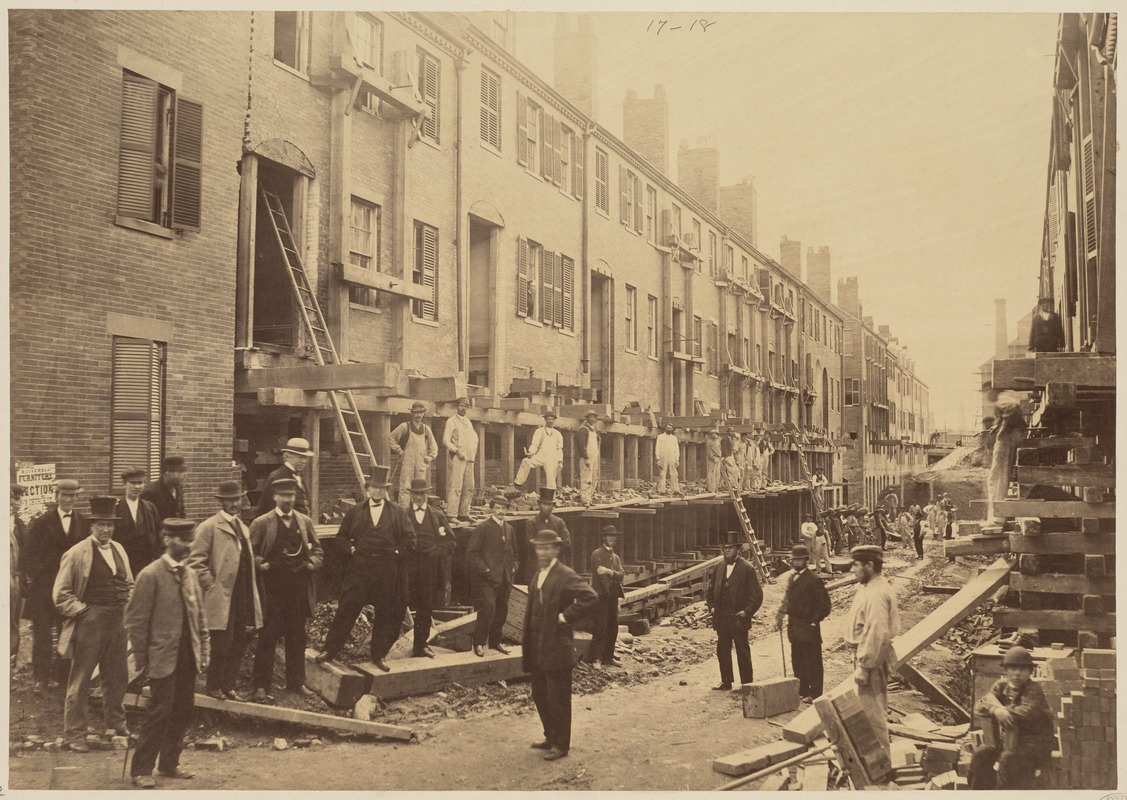
Houses on south side of Fayette Street, west of Church Street

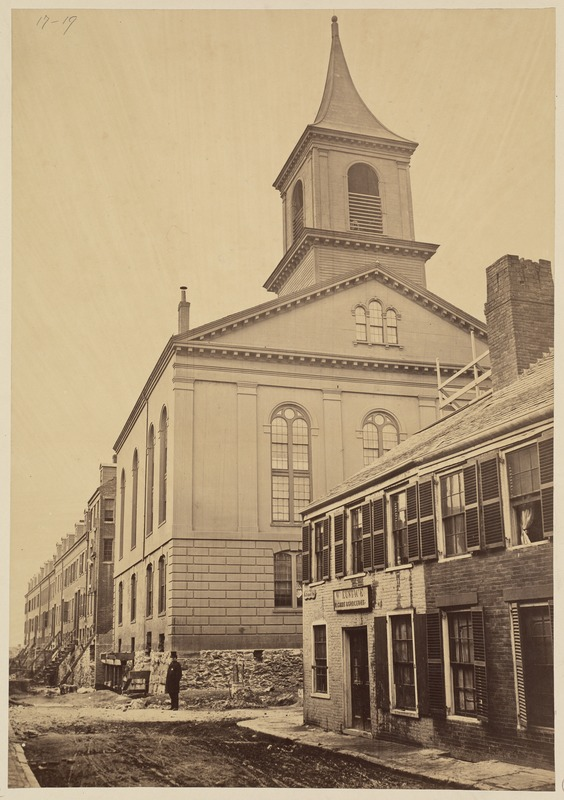
The Church Street Church after being raised in 1868

=== Edgar Allan Poe ===
The American writer Edgar Allan Poe was born at the edge of Bay Village; his parents were both actors in the Theatre District nearby. A commemorative plaque on Boylston Street is a couple of blocks away from the actual location of Poe's birth. The house which was his birthplace at 62 Carver Street no longer exists; also, the street has since been renamed "Charles Street South". A "square" at the intersection of Broadway, Fayette, and Carver Streets had once been named in his honor, but it disappeared when the streets were rearranged. In 2009, the intersection of Charles and Boylston Streets (two blocks north of his birthplace) was newly designated "Edgar Allan Poe Square". A residential condominium a few streets away within Bay Village is also named in his honor, but otherwise has no known connection to the author.

In 2014, a permanent memorial bronze sculpture by Stefanie Rocknak was installed at Edgar Allan Poe Square. Poe Returning to Boston depicts a life-sized Poe striding against the wind, accompanied by a flying raven; his suitcase lid has fallen open, leaving a "paper trail" of literary works embedded in the sidewalk behind him.

=== Cocoanut Grove fire ===
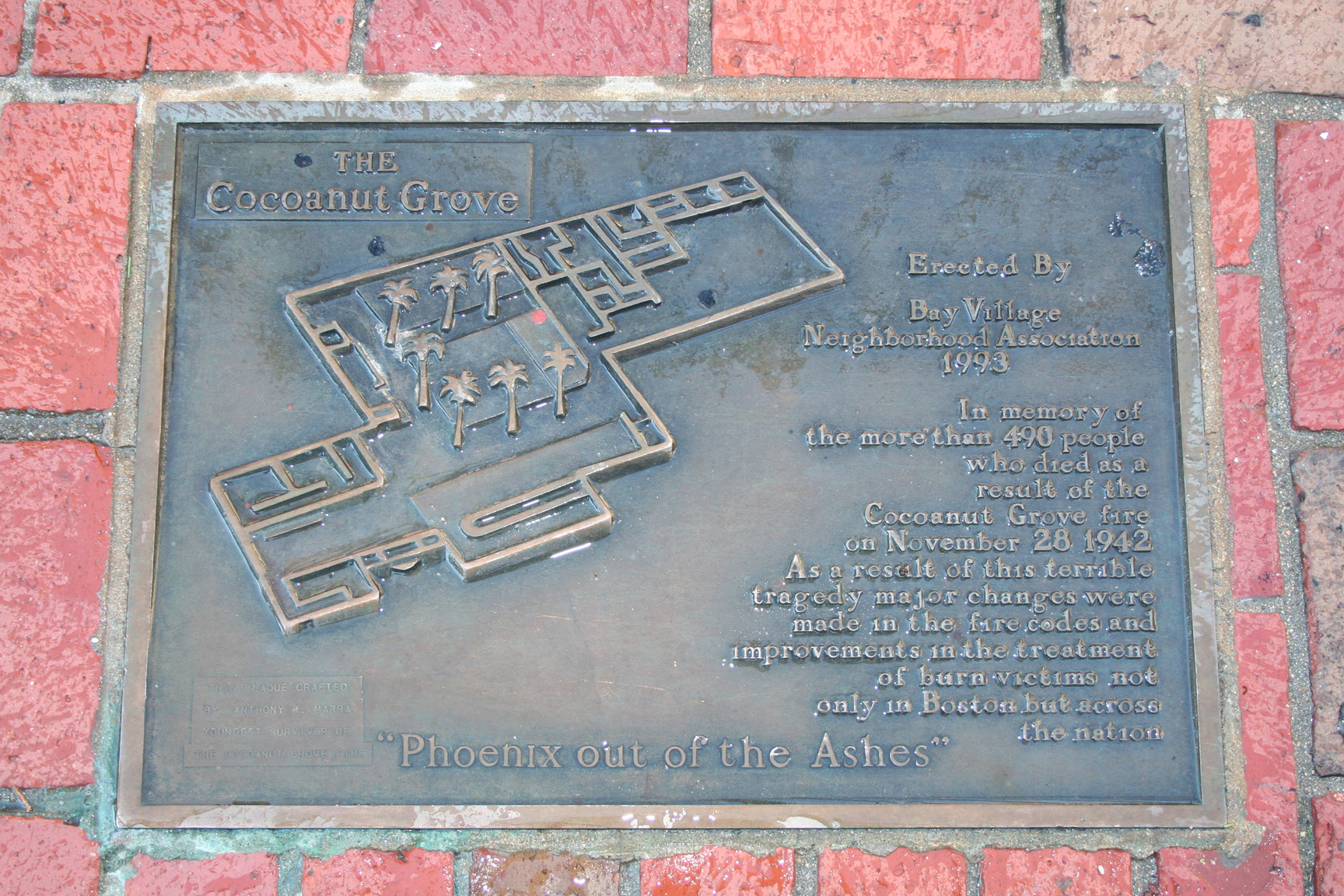
Memorial plaque installed in the sidewalk near the site of the Cocoanut Grove fire

Bay Village was the site of the November 1942 fire at the Cocoanut Grove nightclub, in which 492 people died. Its terrible aftermath led to the creation and enforcement of stringent fire codes across the US, in the hope of preventing other such tragedies. Marking the 50th anniversary of the incident, the Bay Village Neighborhood Association placed a memorial plaque in the brick sidewalk near the club's former site on Piedmont Street, now partially occupied by the Revere Hotel (formerly the Radisson Hotel). The plaque states:

The Cocoanut Grove. Erected by the Bay Village Neighborhood Association, 1993. In memory of the more than 490 people who died in the Cocoanut Grove fire on November 28, 1942. As a result of that terrible tragedy, major changes were made in the fire codes, and improvements in the treatment of burn victims, not only in Boston but across the nation. "Phoenix out of the Ashes"

A smaller inscription in the lower left corner says, "This plaque crafted by Anthony P. Marra, youngest survivor of the Cocoanut Grove fire".

On November 30, 2013, a short street running through the former site of the Cocoanut Grove Club, and previously named "Shawmut Extension", was renamed "Cocoanut Grove Lane". The on-site renaming ceremony was attended by several survivors of the fire and around 250 guests and spectators. Speakers included Marty Walsh, who had recently been elected mayor of Boston, but not yet sworn into office.

The plaque was removed in 2014 for the construction of new condominium residences on the site, but was reinstalled in June 2016 as previously agreed to by the developer. However a few weeks later, the plaque was relocated to the corner of Cocoanut Grove Lane nearby, at the request of some condominium owners. The relocation was objected to by the surviving daughter of Anthony P. Marra (who had designed the plaque), with support from other interested parties. According to a Boston Globe article, the condo owners stated "We now occupy these homes with our families as part of the Bay Village neighborhood and would like to enjoy our homes in peace, without tragic memories, hanging wreaths at our doors and tourists peeking into our houses". One of the condominium developers has claimed that the new placement of the plaque is closer to the original location of the infamous revolving door at the entrance to the nightclub, which had become jammed in the panic and had trapped many victims.

A more substantial monument has been commissioned for installation in Statler Park, one block north of the former nightclub site. It will consist of three 11-foot (3.4 m) arches echoing the original entrance of the nightclub, where many died trying to escape the fire.

In addition, a memorial website has been set up by the Cocoanut Grove Memorial Committee, which offers historical documentation and editorial commentary related to the disaster and its consequences.

== Demographics ==
=== Race and ancestry ===
Back Bay/Bay Village (02116) Racial Breakdown of Population (2017)
Race	Percentage of 02116 population	Percentage of Massachusetts population	Percentage of United States population	ZIP Code-to-State Difference	ZIP Code-to-USA Difference
White	77.1%	81.3%	76.6%	–4.2%	+0.5%
White (Non-Hispanic)	70.9%	72.1%	60.7%	–1.2%	+10.2%
Asian	14.4%	6.9%	5.8%	+7.5%	+8.6%
Hispanic	7.5%	11.9%	18.1%	–4.4%	–10.6%
Black	4.9%	8.8%	13.4%	–3.9%	–8.5%
Native Americans/Hawaiians	0.2%	0.6%	1.5%	–0.4%	–1.3%
Two or more races	2.2%	2.4%	2.7%	–0.2%	–0.5%

According to the 2012-2016 American Community Survey 5-Year Estimates, the largest ancestry groups in ZIP Codes 02116 are:

Ancestry	Percentage of 02116 population	Percentage of Massachusetts population	Percentage of United States population	ZIP Code-to-State Difference	ZIP Code-to-USA Difference
Irish	16.93%	21.16%	10.39%	–4.23%	+6.54%
Italian	10.58%	13.19%	5.39%	–2.61%	+5.19%
Chinese	10.16%	2.28%	1.24%	+7.88%	+8.92%
German	9.82%	6.00%	14.40%	+3.82%	–4.58%
English	9.39%	9.77%	7.67%	–0.39%	+1.72%
Polish	4.84%	4.67%	2.93%	+0.17%	+1.91%
Russian	4.18%	1.65%	0.88%	+2.53%	+3.30%
French	3.25%	6.82%	2.56%	–3.58%	+0.69%
Scottish	2.65%	2.28%	1.71%	+0.37%	+0.94%
American	2.46%	4.26%	6.89%	–1.80%	–4.43%
Puerto Rican	2.46%	4.52%	1.66%	–2.06%	+0.80%
European	2.08%	1.08%	1.23%	+1.00%	–0.85%
Sub-Saharan African	1.72%	2.00%	1.01%	–0.28%	+0.71%
Mexican	1.56%	0.67%	11.96%	+0.89%	–10.40%
Asian Indian	1.52%	1.39%	1.09%	+0.13%	+0.43%
Arab	1.48%	1.10%	0.59%	+0.38%	+0.89%
Swedish	1.39%	1.67%	1.23%	–0.28%	+0.16%
Cape Verdean	1.38%	0.97%	0.03%	+0.41%	+1.35%
French Canadian	1.35%	3.91%	0.65%	–2.55%	+0.70%
Greek	1.29%	1.22%	0.40%	+0.07%	+0.89%
Dutch	1.27%	0.62%	1.32%	+0.65%	–0.05%
Eastern European	1.16%	0.42%	0.17%	+0.74%	+0.99%
Scotch-Irish	1.09%	0.63%	0.96%	+0.46%	+0.13%
British	1.08%	0.48%	0.43%	+0.60%	+0.65%

== Transportation ==
As of 2016, Walk Score rates Bay Village as the fourth most walkable neighborhood in the City of Boston, which itself is rated the third most walkable city in the US, and has a high Transit Score as well. Bay Village has been assigned a Walk Score of 98, and a Transit Score of 100; its lower Bike Score of 71 is still considered "Very Bikeable".

Several MBTA rapid transit stations are located just beyond the boundaries of Bay Village, which is also served by several local bus routes. Commuter rail and Amtrak long-haul trains stop at Back Bay Station and South Station, within walking distance to the west and east of Bay Village, respectively. Inter-city bus services depart from the regional South Station Bus Terminal.

Nearby MBTA stations include:

- Arlington (Green Line)
- Back Bay (Orange Line)
- Boylston station (Green Line)
- Tufts Medical Center (Orange Line)

On-street parking is very scarce within Bay Village, and is mostly reserved for holders of Residential Parking stickers. Commercial parking is available in numerous surface lots and parking garages located near or in the neighborhood. Entrance ramps to the Massachusetts Turnpike (I-90) and the Central Artery (I-93) are a minute's drive away.

== Local media ==
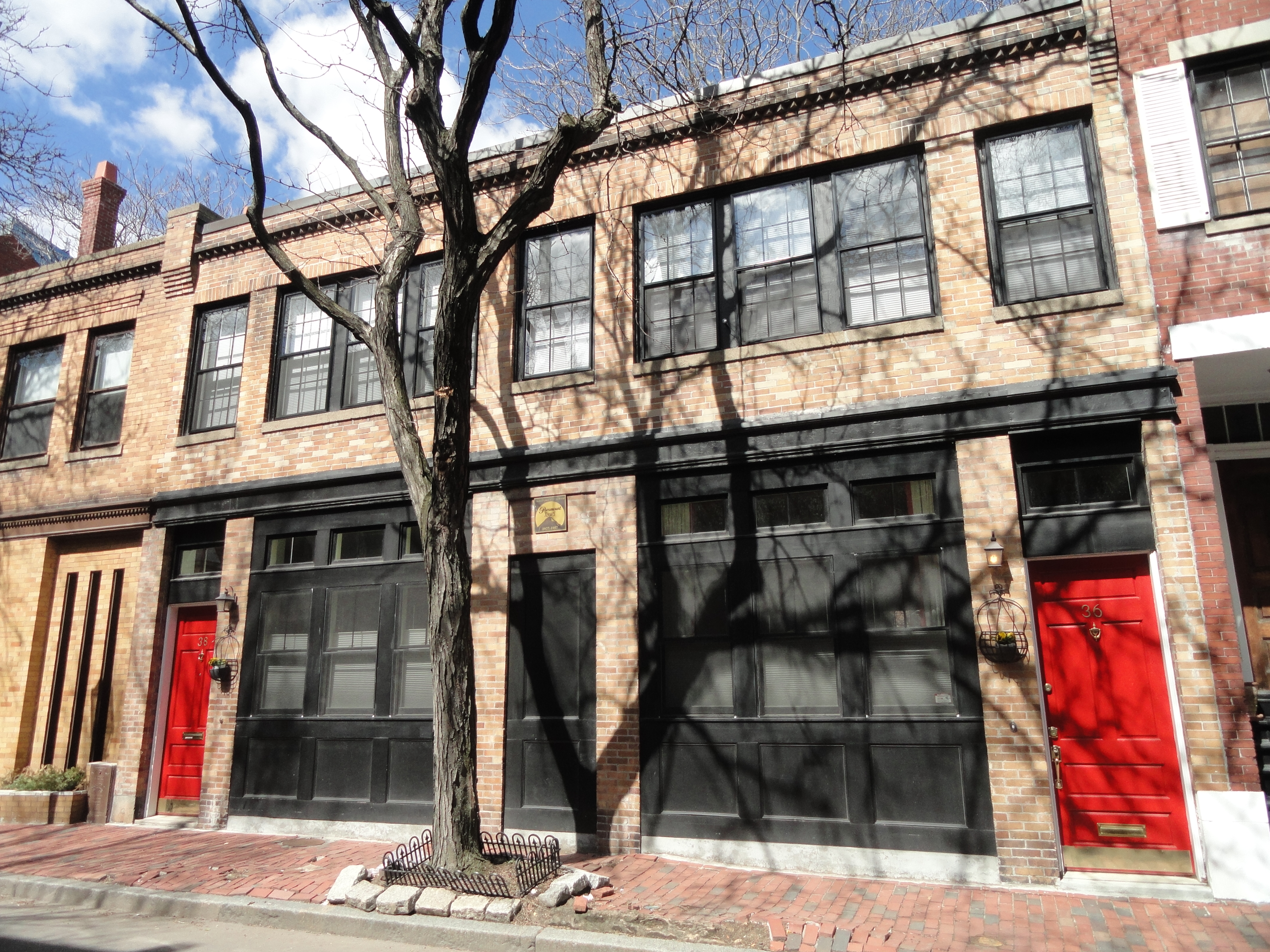
Paramount News Boston depot for storage of flammable movie film and newsreels (1927-1957)

In addition to the larger metropolitan Boston publications, several free local weekly newspapers have had coverage of Bay Village. The neighborhood is so small that it is often included in the South End or Back Bay neighborhoods.

The Boston Courant covered the Back Bay, Beacon Hill, Downtown, Fenway, South End, and the Waterfront neighborhoods of Boston, and included dedicated real estate listings for South End / Bay Village, and events calendar listings. However, the newspaper announced that it would permanently shut down, in its February 6, 2016 edition.

Shortly after that announcement, the Back Bay Sun changed its name to the Boston Sun, and expanded its coverage from the Back Bay to also include the South End and Fenway-Kenmore neighborhoods of Boston. The paper is owned by The Independent Newspaper Group (ING), which also publishes The Beacon Hill Times. This latter newspaper has had some coverage of Bay Village, and is of interest because of the close proximity and historical connections to the Beacon Hill neighborhood.

In 2016, the previous publisher of the defunct Boston Courant debuted a reborn publication under the new banner of the Boston Guardian, serving the Back Bay, Beacon Hill, Downtown, Fenway, South End, and North End/Waterfront districts of Boston. The new publication's title stirred up some controversy over the alleged appropriation of a historic journalistic name.

In addition, the Bay Village Neighborhood Association occasionally has distributed its free quarterly newsletter in the area, and back issues can be downloaded from its website.

== Adjacent neighborhoods and districts ==
- Back Bay
- Chinatown
- Park Square
- South Bay
- South End
- Washington Street Theatre District
