= Bay Village =

Bay Village may refer to:

United States

- Bay Village, Boston, Massachusetts, a neighborhood
- Bay Village, Ohio, a city

Australia

- Stockland Bay Village, a shopping centre in Bateau Bay, New South Wales
