= House at 1 Bay Street =

Historic house in Boston, Massachusetts

- U.S. National Register of Historic Places
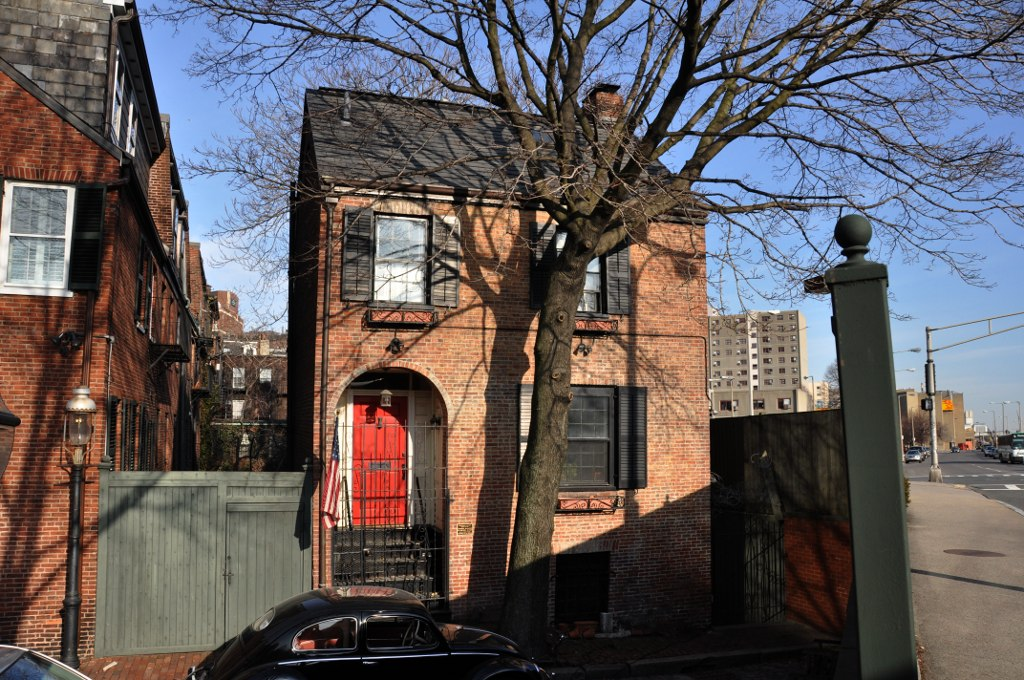

- Location within Boston Location within Massachusetts Location within the United States
- Location: Bay Village, Boston, Massachusetts
- Coordinates: 42°20′53.4″N 71°4′6.0″W
- Built: 1830
- Architect: Bosworth, Benjamin; Bosworth, Joshua
- Architectural style: Federal
- NRHP reference No.: 93001573
- Added to NRHP: February 9, 1994

The House at 1 Bay Street is an historic house at 1 Bay Street in the Bay Village neighborhood of Boston, Massachusetts. Dubbed the "tiniest house in Boston", it is a small 2.5 story brick structure, with a side gable roof and a brick foundation, occupying a lot of just 650 square feet (60 m^{2}). Its front facade is two bays (and about 20 feet (6.1 m)) wide, with the entrance recessed under an arch in the left bay, and sash windows in the other bays. The house was built in 1830 by Benjamin Bosworth, and is a well-preserved example of Federal style.

The house was listed on the National Register of Historic Places in 1994.

== See also ==
- National Register of Historic Places listings in northern Boston, Massachusetts
