= Poe Returning to Boston =

Statue in Boston, Massachusetts, U.S.

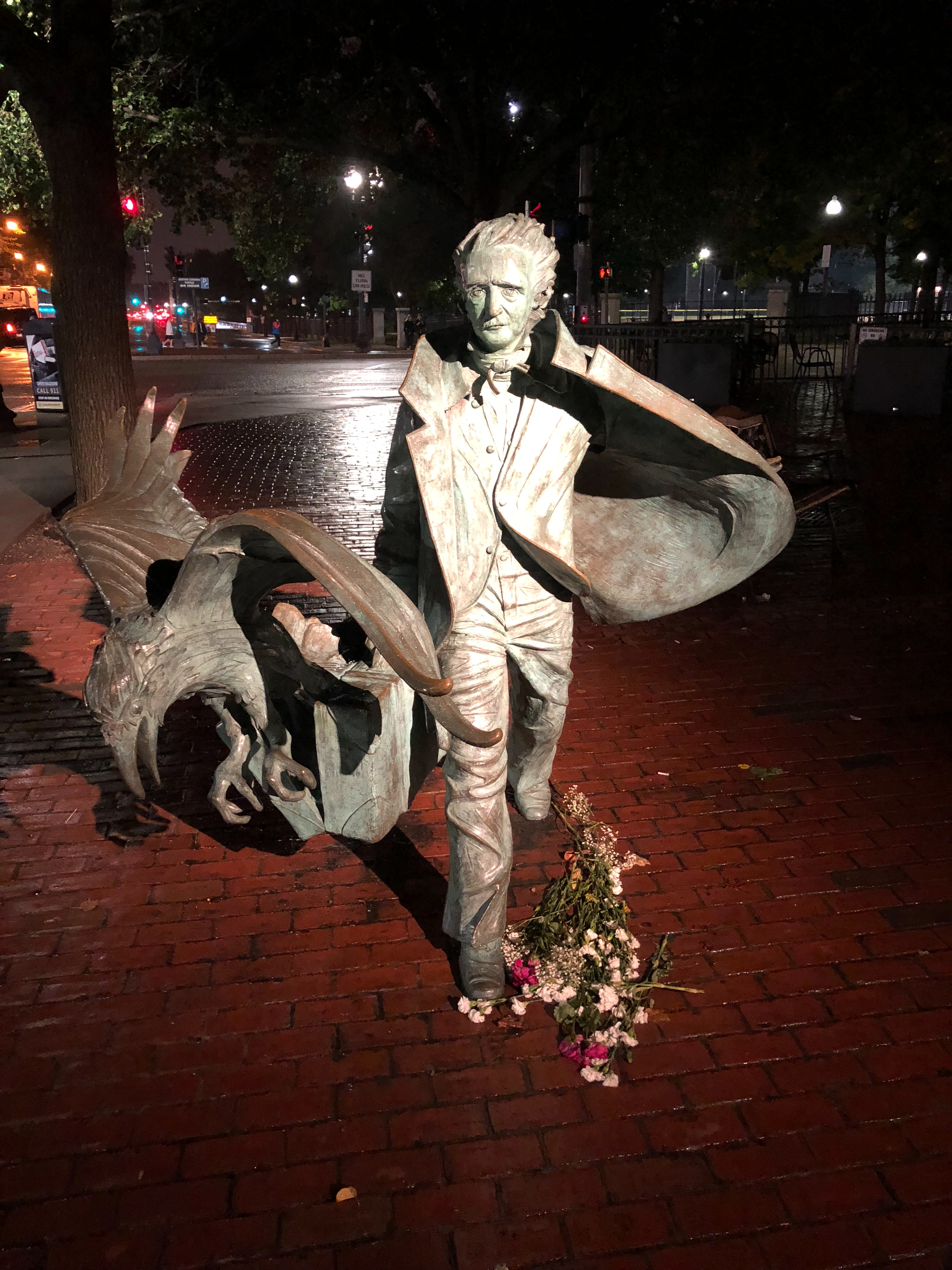
- Artist: Stefanie Rocknak
- Year: 2014
- Medium: Bronze
- Subject: Edgar Allan Poe
- Location: Edgar Allan Poe Square, Boston, Massachusetts; 42°21′8.4″N 71°4′2.3″W

Poe Returning to Boston is a statue of American author Edgar Allan Poe in Boston, Massachusetts. It was commissioned at the request of sisters Pat and Priscilla Bartevian and created by the American sculptor Stefanie Rocknak. The statue is located at the corner of Boylston and Charles streets at Edgar Allan Poe Square.

The statue depicts Poe walking, facing away from the Boston Common. His figure is accompanied by an oversized flying raven; his suitcase lid has fallen open, leaving a "paper trail" of literary works embedded in the sidewalk behind him. The public unveiling on October 5, 2014, was attended by former United States Poet Laureate Robert Pinsky.
