= Stefanie Rocknak =

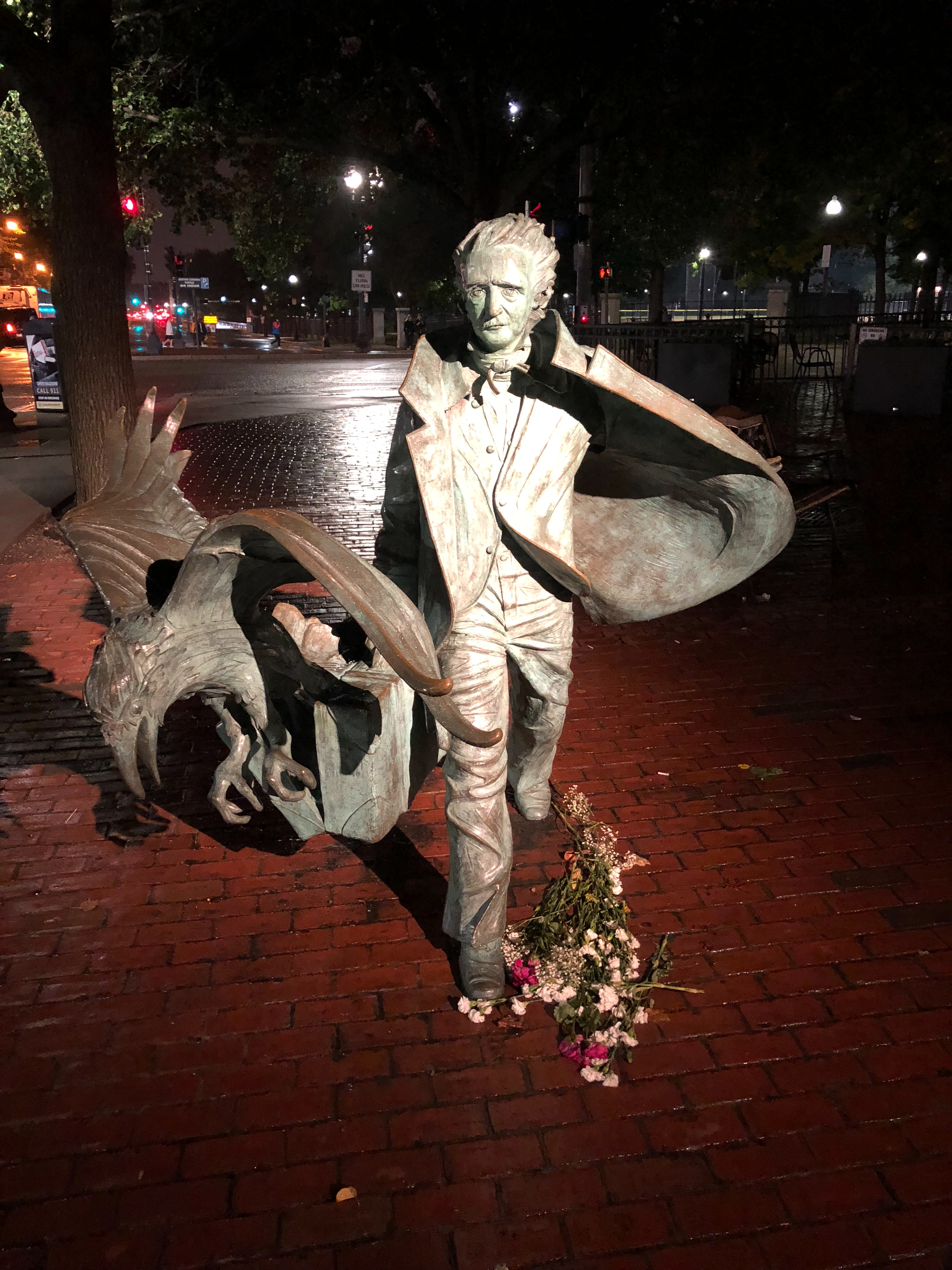
Poe Returning to Boston, 2018

Stefanie Rocknak is an American academic and sculptor, best known for her 2014 public statue of the American author Edgar Allan Poe, Poe Returning to Boston. She is a professor and chair of philosophy and cognitive science at Hartwick College in Oneonta, New York. She is currently completing work on a statue of American writer Herman Melville in New Bedford, Massachusetts.
